= Richie Davis (musician) =

American guitarist and bandleader

Richard "Richie" Peter Davis
- Circa 2010

Background information
- Born: Richard Peter Davis; December 30, 1957 (age 68); Chicago, Illinois, United States
- Origin: Chicago, Illinois
- Genres: R&B, pop, funk, soul
- Occupations: Musician, bandleader, composer
- Instrument: Guitar
- Years active: 1969 onwards
- Member of: Chicago Catz
- Website: chicagocatz.com

Richard Peter Davis (born December 30, 1957, in Chicago, Illinois, United States) is an American guitarist and bandleader who is Chicago-based. He is the son of actor Nathan Davis, the brother of director Andrew Davis, and a co-founder/current member of the rhythm and blues band known as the Chicago Catz.

== Biography ==
=== Musical education and influences ===
The performing arts are in Richie's blood, being born to parents that met while they were both members of The Chicago Repertory Group during the New Deal years of the 1930s performing in politically oriented "lefty shows", a precursor to the Federal Theatre Project. Richie grew up in Chicago in the Jeffrey Manor neighborhood located on the southeast side of the city near the old steel mills along with an older brother (Andrew Davis) and sister.

As a pre-teen Richie constantly listened to music on his transistor radio to the local Chicago radio stations WVON, WCFL, WLS, and WGRT listening to a large variety of pop music that would influence his later musical life. He couldn't get enough of the music-variety television shows of the time, his favorites being the early Sunday morning Jubilee Showcase and Hee-Haw. A musical revelation occurred when he borrowed from the local library a copy of the latest album release by B. B. King "Live in Cook County Jail". In 1969, while attending sixth grade, Richie encountered a classmate that brought an old beat-up guitar to school (Sears Silvertone with in-case amp). Richie started to play the guitar picking out notes on the strings to a popular tune of the time and got a tremendous response from an audience of on-looking students. His musical career had started.

Around this same time his older brother Andrew returned from a trip to Europe and gave Richie a copy of the album "Are You Experienced" by a new guitar artist very popular in England at the time, Jimi Hendrix. Also during this time period, the neighborhood that Richie and his family had been living in went through a major change for about two years, from a population of about 99% white to about 99% black, due to a real estate practice going on at the time in Chicago known as Redlining. His politically oriented parents chose to make a statement by deciding to remain living in the changing neighborhood. Regarding this change, Richie was interviewed years later by Studs Terkel for his book on race. This occurrence added to his musical experience as he acquired skill at playing the guitar and as a result he began jamming with local area musical talent which was a mix of black and white music including pop music, funk and R&B. Specific musicians that have influenced his musical world are rhythm guitarists Eric Gale, Cornell Dupree, Nile Rodgers, Tony Maiden, Al McKay. Other musical influences are James Brown, Prince, Johnny Winter, John McLaughlin, Frank Zappa, and Wes Montgomery. Up until this time Richie had not really had any formal training on the guitar or music.

=== Early career ===
1975–1978 After attending some college intent on being a biology major, Richie's brother, Andrew Davis a budding cinematographer-turned-movie director at the time, asked Richie to star in a film he was making called Stony Island about a musician living and working in the Chicago inner city. Richie cut a single with Patrice Rushen entitled "Stony Island Band" for the movie soundtrack. He then moved to Los Angeles and began formal education in music and guitar with Ted Greene, Jimmy Wyble, and attending the Dick Grove Music Workshop which later became known as The Grove School of Music.

=== Later career ===
Richie formed the Chicago Catz in 1986.

=== Current musical associations ===
Richie has worked with many musicians and session recording artists including the Chicago Catz, "Downtown" Tony Brown, Kevin Smith, Mark Ohlsen, Wayne Stewart, David Gross, Devin Thompson, James A. Perkins Jr., Chicago and Tony "Toca" Carpenter.

== Discography ==
=== Albums ===
- (1982) Maxx Traxx – Maxx Traxx
- (1991) Keith Washington – Make Time for Love
- (1994) Tad Robinson – One To Infinity
- (1995) Bonnie Lee – Sweetheart of the Blues
- (1997) Brian Culbertson – Secrets
- (2000) Big DooWopper – All in the Joy
- (2000) Glen Washington – Free Up The Vibes
- (2001) Big Time Sarah – Million of You
- (2002) Mike Phillips – You Have Reached Mike Phillips
- (2003) Dave Gordon – Faux Real
- (2003) Do or Die – Pimpin' Ain't Dead
- (2005) Do Or Die – DOD
- (2005) Mariah Carey – The Emancipation of Mimi (uncredited track – "My One and Only")
- (2007) Howard Hewett – If Only...
- (2007) B-Cow – Squur Dance
- (2010) Lisa McClowry – Time Signatures
- (2015) Brian Wilson – No Pier Pressure
- (2022) Chicago – Born For This Moment

== Filmography ==
=== Soundtracks ===
- (1989) The Package (composer: "I Don't Know")
- (1992) Under Siege (composer: "RAP MAMA GOOSE", "LOVE YOU TO DEATH", "SEA OF BLUES")
- (1998) A Perfect Murder (composer: songs "Velver Night", "Black Alley Rap" and "Park Jam")
- (2003) Holes (composer: "I'm Gonna Run", "Stranger", "Clear the Air", "Happy Dayz")
- (2006) The Guardian (composer: "Once Again", "So Lovely", "Hold Tight", "No More You", "Shake Up the World", "Friday Night") (performer: "Once Again")

=== Actor ===
- (1978) Stony Island as Richie Bloom
- (1992) Under Siege as Bail Jumper
- (2006) The Guardian as Guitarist with Chicago Catz

== Publications ==
- Race: What Blacks and Whites Think and Feel About the American Obsession (1992) by Studs Terkel ISBN 978-1-56584-000-3
