= Dov Hoenig =

American film editor and novelist (born 1932)

- Born: April 24, 1932 (age 94)
- Occupation: Film editor

Dov Hoenig (born April 24, 1932) is an American film editor. He was nominated at the 66th Academy Awards for Best Film Editing for the 1993 film The Fugitive, sharing the nomination with Don Brochu, David Finfer, Dean Goodhill, Richard Nord and Dennis Virkler.

Hoenig has edited on other films, such as The Last of the Mohicans, Diamonds, Operation Thunderbolt, Manhunter, She's Out of Control, Overboard, A Perfect Murder, Under Siege and Collateral Damage. He has also been a member of the American Cinema Editors.

Hoenig is the author of a novel, Triumph Street: Bucharest, which was named as one of the 10 best first novels by the jury of the Stanislas Prize.

== Filmography ==
Editor
| Year | Film | Director | Notes |
|---|---|---|---|
| 1968 | Tevye and His Seven Daughters | Menahem Golan | First collaboration with Menahem Golan |
| 1968 | Topele | Leo Filler | |
| 1969 | My Margo | Menahem Golan | Second collaboration with Menahem Golan |
| 1970 | The Customer of the Off Season | Moshé Mizrahi | First collaboration with Moshé Mizrahi |
| 1970 | Sophie's Ways | Moshé Mizrahi | Second collaboration with Moshé Mizrahi |
| 1971 | Ariana | George Ovadiah | First collaboration with George Ovadiah |
| 1972 | I Love You Rosa | Moshé Mizrahi | Third collaboration with Moshé Mizrahi |
| 1972 | The Pill | David Perlov | |
| 1973 | Sugar Cookies | Theodore Gershuny | |
| 1973 | The House on Chelouche Street | Moshé Mizrahi | Fourth collaboration with Moshé Mizrahi |
| 1973 | Kazablan | Menahem Golan | Third collaboration with Menahem Golan |
| 1973 | Big Gus, What's the Fuss? | Ami Artzi; Lloyd Kaufman | |
| 1973 | Daughters, Daughters | Moshé Mizrahi | Fifth collaboration with Moshé Mizrahi |
| 1974 | Sarit | George Ovadiah; Shimon Herma | Second collaboration with George Ovadiah |
| 1975 | Lepke | Menahem Golan | Fourth collaboration with Menahem Golan |
| 1975 | Diamonds | Menahem Golan | Fifth collaboration with Menahem Golan |
| 1975 | Rachel's Man | Moshé Mizrahi | Sixth collaboration with Moshé Mizrahi |
| 1976 | The Passover Plot | Michael Campus | |
| 1977 | Operation Thunderbolt | Menahem Golan | Sixth collaboration with Menahem Golan |
| 1978 | The Uranium Conspiracy | Gianfranco Baldanello; Menahem Golan | Seventh collaboration with Menahem Golan |
| 1978 | Stony Island | Andrew Davis | First collaboration with Andrew Davis |
| 1979 | The Magician of Lublin | Menahem Golan | Eighth collaboration with Menahem Golan |
| 1981 | Thief | Michael Mann | First collaboration with Michael Mann |
| 1982 | Young Doctors in Love | Garry Marshall | First collaboration with Garry Marshall |
| 1983 | The Keep | Michael Mann | Second collaboration with Michael Mann |
| 1984 | Beat Street | Stan Lathan | |
| 1986 | Manhunter | Michael Mann | Third collaboration with Michael Mann |
| 1987 | Overboard | Garry Marshall | Second collaboration with Garry Marshall |
| 1989 | She's Out of Control | Stan Dragoti | |
| 1992 | The Last of the Mohicans | Michael Mann | Fifth collaboration with Michael Mann |
| 1992 | Under Siege | Andrew Davis | Third collaboration with Andrew Davis |
| 1993 | The Fugitive | Andrew Davis | Fourth collaboration with Andrew Davis |
| 1994 | The Crow | Alex Proyas | First collaboration with Alex Proyas |
| 1994 | Street Fighter | Steven E. de Souza | |
| 1995 | Heat | Michael Mann | Sixth collaboration with Michael Mann |
| 1996 | Chain Reaction | Andrew Davis | Fifth collaboration with Andrew Davis |
| 1998 | A Perfect Murder | Andrew Davis | Sixth collaboration with Andrew Davis |
| 1998 | Dark City | Alex Proyas | Second collaboration with Alex Proyas |
| 2002 | Collateral Damage | Andrew Davis | Seventh collaboration with Andrew Davis |

Editorial department
| Year | Film | Director | Role |
|---|---|---|---|
| 2000 | The Adventures of Rocky and Bullwinkle | Des McAnuff | Additional editor |

Thanks
| Year | Film | Director | Role | Notes |
|---|---|---|---|---|
| 1985 | Code of Silence | Andrew Davis | Special thanks | Second collaboration with Andrew Davis |

TV movies

Editor
| Year | Film | Director | Notes |
|---|---|---|---|
| 1989 | L.A. Takedown | Michael Mann | Fourth collaboration with Michael Mann |

TV series

Editor
| Year | Title | Notes |
|---|---|---|
| 1985 | Miami Vice | Episode: "The Prodigal Son" |
