= Natalia Nogulich =

American actress

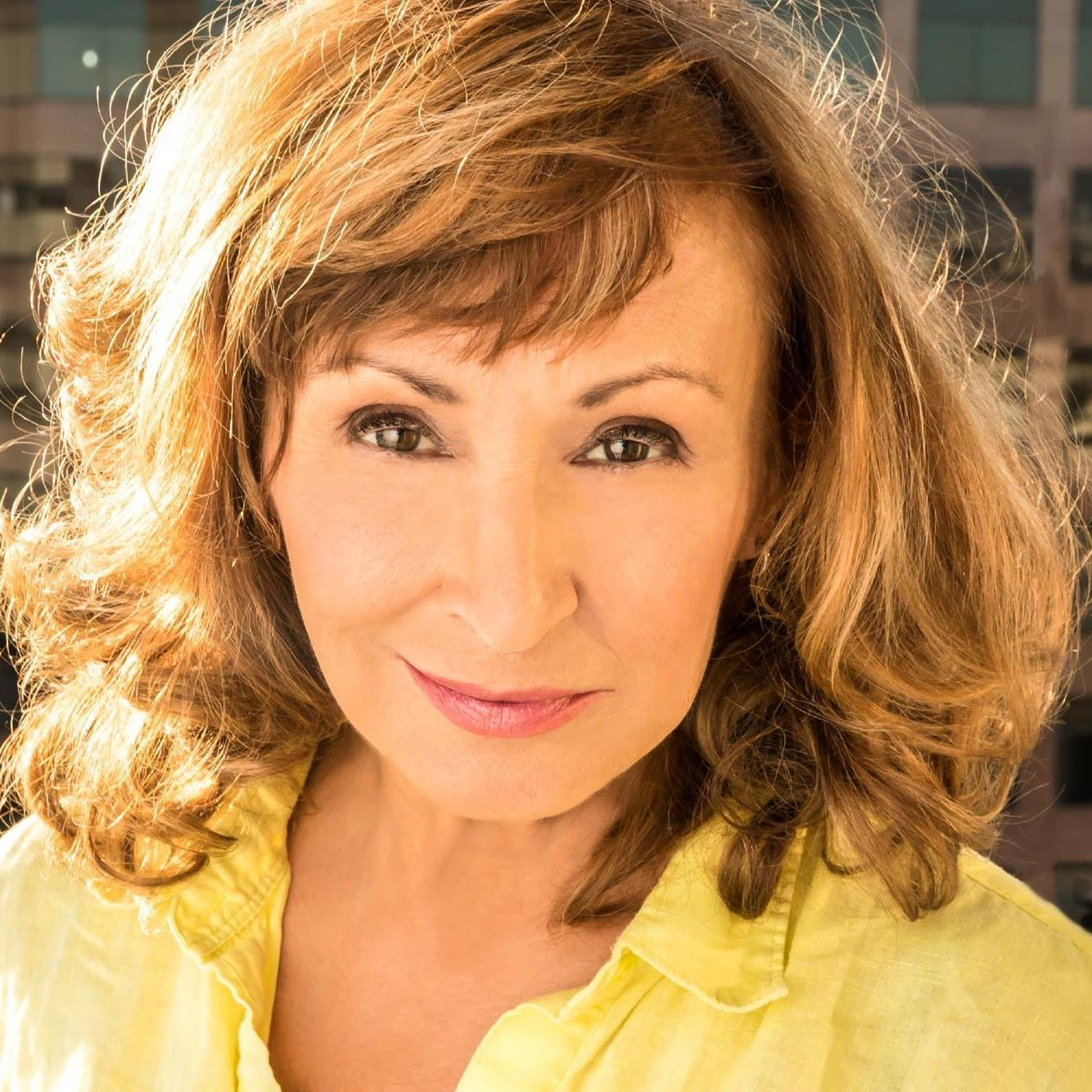
- Nogulich in 2018
- Occupations: Actress, author
- Years active: 1978–present

Natalia Nogulich is an American film and television actress and author.

Nogulich's best-known appearances have been on Star Trek: The Next Generation and Star Trek: Deep Space Nine as Vice Admiral Alynna Nechayev.

She portrayed Josephine Hoffa in the film Hoffa and provided the voice for Mon Mothma for the radio adaptation of Return of the Jedi.

== Selected filmography ==
- 1978 Stony Island as Mr. Moss' Honey
- 1980 Lou Grant (TV Series) as Pat
- 1981 Four Friends as Vera
- 1984 Vamping as Julie
- 1986 Designing Women (TV Series) as Professor Primrose "Primmie" Horton
- 1987 Simon & Simon (TV Series) as Sonia
- 1987 Dynasty (TV Series) as April
- 1987 Sister, Sister as Fran Steuben
- 1987 Cagney & Lacey (TV Series) as Louise Poe
- 1988 The Dirty Dozen: The Fatal Mission (TV Movie) as Yelena Petrovic
- 1988 Things Change as Anna
- 1988-1991 Matlock (TV Series) as Dr. Barbara Reilkin / Marjorie Manners
- 1989 Dirty Dancing (TV Series)
- 1989 Coach (TV Series) as Madame Roola
- 1989 National Lampoon's Christmas Vacation as Mrs. Shirley
- 1990 Tales from the Crypt (TV Series) as Madame Vorna
- 1990 The Guardian as Molly Sheridan
- 1990 Postcards from the Edge as Friend At Airport
- 1990–1994 L.A. Law (TV Series) as Lorraine Korshak / Helen Keris
- 1991 Father Dowling Mysteries (TV Series) as Mrs. Hudson
- 1991 The Boys (TV Movie) as Denise
- 1991 Homicide as Chava
- 1991-1992 Brooklyn Bridge (TV Series) as Aunt Miriam
- 1992 The Water Engine (TV Movie) as Soapbox Speaker Two
- 1992 Freshman Dorm (TV Series) as Mrs. Beckenstein
- 1992 Hoffa as Josephine "Jo" Hoffa
- 1992 The Prom as Healer
- 1992-1993 Civil Wars (TV Series) as Lorraine Wofford
- 1992–1994 Star Trek: The Next Generation (TV Series) as Admiral Alynna Nechayev
- 1992–1995 Murder, She Wrote (TV Series) as Denise Naveau / Marika Valenti
- 1992–1995 Picket Fences (TV Series) as Louise Talbot
- 1993 It's Nothing Personal (TV Movie)
- 1993 Blood In Blood Out as Janis
- 1993 Moon Over Miami (TV Series) as Kate
- 1994 The Chase as Frances Voss
- 1994 Children of the Dark (TV Movie) as Stanja Janecek
- 1994 Confessions of a Sorority Girl (TV Movie) as Mrs. Masterson
- 1994 The Glass Shield as Judge Helen Lewis
- 1994 Star Trek: Deep Space Nine (TV Series) as Fleet Admiral Alynna Nechayev
- 1995 Above Suspicion as Defense Attorney Wallace
- 1995 Steal Big Steal Little as Alice
- 1995 NewsRadio (TV Series) as Melanie Sanders
- 1995 Ned and Stacey (TV Series) as Bernadette MacDowel
- 1996 Eye for an Eye as Susan Juke
- 1996 Murder One (TV Series) as Martina Spector
- 1996 After Jimmy (TV Movie) as Lydia
- 1996 Dark Skies (TV Series) as Dr. Helen Gould
- 1996 The Shot as Theatre Director
- 1996 The Lazarus Man (TV Series) as Joie DeWinter
- 1996-1999 The Pretender (TV Series) as Susan Granger
- 1997 The Sleepwalker Killing (TV Movie) as Attorney Brooke McAdam
- 1997 The Practice (TV Series) as Judge Stevens
- 1997–1999 Tracey Takes On... (TV Series) as Paige
- 1998 Prey (TV Series) as Dr. Ann Coulter
- 1998 Jenny (TV Series) as Sophia
- 1998 The Get as Mother
- 1998 Frasier (TV Series) as Susan Kendall
- 1998 Home Improvement (TV Series) as Agatha
- 1998 Caroline in the City (TV Series) as Ms. Kaye "Kitty" Reynaldo
- 1999 Restraining Order as Judge Hargreaves
- 1999 Chicago Hope (TV Series) as Principal
- 1999 Ryan Caulfield: Year One (TV Series)
- 1999 Grown Ups (TV Series) as The Director
- 2001 Days of Our Lives (TV Series) as Ingrid Mitchell
- 2002 Nikki (TV Series) as Frances
- 2002 Sabrina, the Teenage Witch (TV Series) as Geri, Josh's Mother
- 2002 Ally McBeal (TV Series) as Melissa Bloom
- 2002 Charmed (TV Series) as Evil Witch
- 2002 For the People (TV Series) as Dr. MacDougal
- 2003 Without a Trace (TV Series) as Rosalind Kandell
- 2003 Frankie and Johnny Are Married as Theater Patron
- 2004 It's All Relative (TV Series)
- 2004 JAG (TV Series) as Diamond Saleswoman
- 2004 Spartan as Nadya
- 2004 The Division (TV Series) as Jean Morrison
- 2004 Crossing Jordan (TV Series) as Mrs. Novotna
- 2004 The Hollow (TV Movie) as Nancy Worthen
- 2004 Medical Investigation (TV Series) as Dahlia
- 2004 The West Wing (TV Series) as Israeli Ambassador Shira Galit
- 2004 Huff (TV Series) as Dr. Ann Brunner
- 2005 The Closer (TV Series) as Kingsley's Lawyer
- 2005 Pizza My Heart (TV Movie) as Mary Prestolani
- 2005 Nip/Tuck (TV Series) as Shirley
- 2006 Bones (TV Series) as Ivana Bardu
- 2006 So NoTORIous (TV Series) as Touca
- 2006 The Unit (TV Series) as Evelyn
- 2008 Immigrants (English version, voice)
- 2011 I Melt with You as Patient
- 2011 Hot in Cleveland (TV Series) as Vadoma
- 2014 Criminal Minds (TV Series) as Helen Clark
- 2015 Sharkskin as Rose
- 2015 K.C. Undercover (TV Series) as Mrs. Vandervoort (credited as "Natalija Nogulich")
- 2016 Incarnate as Maggie, In The Car
- 2017 The Last Word as Middle Aged Woman
- 2019 Caretakers (2019) as Alana, The Ambassador's Wife
- 2018–2020 Fuller House as Berta (3 episodes)
- 2019–2022 Chicago Med (TV Series) as Maria Piscotta / Melinda Witherdale (2 episodes)
