= Nathan Davis (actor) =

American actor

- Born: May 22, 1917; Chicago, Illinois, U.S
- Died: October 15, 2008 (aged 91); Chicago, Illinois, U.S.
- Years active: 1970s-2008
- Children: 3, including Richie and Andrew

Nathan Davis (May 22, 1917 – October 15, 2008) was an American actor. He was the father of director Andrew Davis, and appeared in many of his son's films. He was also three-time Jeff Award nominee for his stage work.

== Early life ==
Davis was born in Chicago, Illinois, the son of Romanian-Jewish immigrants, Rose (née Marcus) and Fred Davis. He served in Europe during World War II and performed on the local stage and in radio productions after the war. Davis was also a pharmaceutical sales rep by trade but pursued acting after being fired from his sales job in the late '70s.

== Acting career ==
Davis started acting in the late 1970s. He appeared on Mister Rogers' Neighborhood in 1975 and in films such as Dunston Checks In, Thief, Poltergeist III, and many others. He often appeared in films directed by his son Andrew, notably as the grandfather to Shia LaBeouf's character in the Disney film Holes.

He was nominated for a 1980 Jeff Award for Actor in a Principal Role in a Play for his performance in Buried Child at the Northlight Theatre. He was again nominated for The Sunshine Boys at the National Jewish Theater, and a third time in 2001 for 2 1/2 Jews at the Apple Tree Theatre.

== Personal life ==
He was married to Metta (née Talmy). They had three children: Chicago musician Richard "Richie" Peter Davis, Hollywood film director Andrew Davis, and Jo Ellen Davis Friedman.

=== Death ===
Davis died from emphysema and complications of pneumonia in Chicago at age 91.

== Filmography ==
=== Film ===
Year	Title	Role	Notes
1978	A Steady Rain	The Bartender	
1978	Stony Island	Lewis	
1979	Dummy	Policeman	
1981	Hudson Taylor	Guard	
1981	On the Right Track	Mario	
1981	Thief	Grossman	
1983	Risky Business	Business Teacher	
1984	Windy City	Mr. Jones	
1985	Code of Silence	Felix Scalese	Directed by his son Andrew Davis
1986	One More Saturday Night	Desk Clerk	
1986	Tough Guys	Jimmy Ellis	
1987	Burglar	Mr. Paggif	
1987	Flowers in the Attic	Grandfather Foxworth	
1988	Poltergeist III	Reverend Henry Kane/Polo	
1989	The Package	Soviet Press Secretary	Directed by his son
1990	Shaking the Tree	Grandpa Sullivan	
1995	Steal Big Steal Little	Harry Lordly, Attorney of Record for Bonnie Martin	Directed by his son
1996	Dunston Checks In	Victor Dubrow	
1996	Chain Reaction	Morris Grodsky	Directed by his son
2001	Almost Salinas	Zelder Hill	
2003	Holes	Stanley Yelnats II	Directed by his son
2006	Let's Go to Prison	Old Juror	

=== Television ===
Year	Title	Role	N otes
1981	The Children Nobody Wanted	Orville	TV movie
1982	Will: G. Gordon Liddy	Brian Finkle	TV movie
1984	Too Close for Comfort	Mr. Rosenberg	Episode: "The Enemy Above"
1986	Hill Street Blues	Aaron Levine	Episode: "A Case of Klapp"
1987	Crime Story	Izzy 'The Dancer' Abrams	2 episodes
1987	Wiseguy	Don "Joey Bags" Baglia	
1987	Murder Ordained	Doctor	
1988	Sable	Philip Lazlo	Episode: "Mob"
1990	Father Dowling Mysteries	Malko	Episode: "The Visiting Priest Mystery"
1991	Cheers	Mr. Quincy	Episode: "Carla Loves Clavin"
1995	Frasier	Otto	Episode: "The Innkeepers"
1997	ER	Mr. Novotny	Episode: "The Long Way Around"
1999	Becker	Milton Fowler	Episode: "Larry Spoke"
