= Christmas 25th Anniversary Collection =

Studio album by Mannheim Steamroller
- Released: October 13, 2009
- Recorded: 1984–2009
- Genre: Christmas
- Label: American Gramaphone
- Producer: Chip Davis

Mannheim Steamroller chronology
Christmasville (2008)	Christmas 25th Anniversary Collection (2009)

Mannheim Steamroller Christmas albums chronology
Christmasville (2008)	Christmas 25th Anniversary Collection (2009)

Professional ratings
Review scores
Source	Rating
Allmusic	4/5 stars

Christmas 25th Anniversary Collection is a compilation album by Mannheim Steamroller. It is the group's eleventh Christmas album overall. It was released in 2009 as a double CD by American Gramaphone, and features 25 Christmas songs. It contains songs from their Mannheim Steamroller Christmas (1984), A Fresh Aire Christmas (1988), Christmas in the Aire (1995), My Little Christmas Tree (1997), The Christmas Angel: A Family Story (1998), Christmas Extraordinaire (2001), Christmas Song (2007) and Christmasville (2008).

== Track listing ==
=== CD 1 ===
1. "Faeries" [from The Nutcracker]
2. "Gagliarda"
3. "My Little Christmas Tree"
4. "We Three Kings"
5. "Joseph Dear, Oh Joseph Mine"
6. "It Came Upon the Midnight Clear"
7. "Have Yourself a Merry Little Christmas"
8. "Joy to the World"
9. "First Noel"
10. "Pat a Pan"
11. "Let It Snow, Let It Snow, Let It Snow"
12. "Cantique de Noël" ("O Holy Night")

=== CD 2 ===
1. "Traditions of Christmas (Music Box)"
2. "Messengers of Christmas"
3. "Lo, How a Rose E'er Blooming"
4. "Winter Wonderland"
5. "The Christmas Song"
6. "Hark! The Herald Trumpets Sing"
7. "Hark! The Herald Angels Sing"
8. "Above the Northern Lights"
9. "Jingle Bells"
10. "The Holly and the Ivy"
11. "The Little Drummer Boy"
12. "Still, Still, Still"
13. "O' Little Town of Bethlehem"
