= Kevin Smith (musician) =

- Birth name: Kevin Smith
- Born: February 10, 1956 (age 69)
- Origin: Chicago, Illinois, US
- Genres: R&B, pop, funk, soul, gospel
- Occupation(s): musician, composer, arranger, keyboardist, vocalist
- Instrument: Keyboards
- Years active: 1969–present
- Website: chicagocatz.com

Kevin Smith (born February 20, 1956, in Chicago, Illinois) is an American composer, arranger, producer, vocalist and keyboardist who is Chicago-based. He is a current member of the rhythm and blues band known as the Chicago Catz.

== Biography ==
=== Musical education and influences ===
As a child, Smith always listened to the music around him, from church broadcasts with his grandmother to television shows like American Bandstand, Shindig!, Rock Concert, Midnight Special, and Lawrence Welk. On the radio, he heard jazz, country, rock & roll, classical and R&B. When he was about seven or eight a neighbor had a piano and Smith learned boogie-woogie in F sharp and "Heart & Soul" in C by ear. He started playing the saxophone in the fourth grade, when he learned to read music.

He attended Thornwood High School, then Kishwaukee College and Northern Illinois University. Kevin's musical influences are Maurice Ravel, Clarence Wheeler, Chuck Mangione, Quincy Jones, Leonard Bernstein, James Brown, George Clinton, The Beatles, as well as the television shows Hee Haw, The Ed Sullivan Show, Hollywood Palace, The Gary Moore Show, and Jubilee Showcase.

His musical style is considered eclectic. Having been exposed to so many differing genres and styles, he likes to (when possible) mix it up stylistically. Most of the projects he has worked on are R&B oriented, but he appreciates the sophisticated harmonies of gospel, nice string arrangements and "rocked out" guitars whenever possible. The aspect of music Smith prefers is the ability to express emotions vocally or instrumentally. He has a background in sound design and likes to employ sound effects as well as music to convey a feeling.

=== Early career ===
Smith's father managed a band that Kevin and his sister and brother performed in. They did gigs all over the Chicago area playing clubs and private parties during high school years. Out of this musical family, Kevin was the only one that decided to go professional.

=== Later career ===
In 1985, Smith worked with Chuck Mangione as the arranger on the album Save Tonight For Me Mangione was one of Smith's biggest influences as an arranger and to spend time collaborating with one of the masters was one of the most inspiring moments of his career.

Smith undertook three tours of Italy in 2004, 2005, and 2007 with the traditional gospel group, Tecora Rogers & The Chicago Spirituals. He has performed in the U.S. Virgin Islands, Hawaii, Las Vegas, Mexico, Bahamas, Washington, D.C., with the Chicago Catz.

He taught Commercial Music Production at Columbia College in their marketing department. He also has substituted as a music teacher in the Chicago Public Schools. Smith has led music therapy groups for the Thresholds Organization in Chicago. He currently teaches keyboard/theory privately when not playing with the Chicago Catz and as a sideman in several other musical projects.

=== Current musical associations ===
Me has worked with many musicians and session recording artists including the Chicago Catz, "Downtown" Tony Brown, Richie Davis, Mark Ohlsen, Wayne Stewart, David Gross, Josie Aiello, Devin Thompson, James A. Perkins Jr., and Tony "Toca" Carpenter.

== Discography ==
=== Albums ===
- (1986) Chuck Mangione – Save Tonight For Me
