= Josie Aiello =

American singer-songwriter

- Born: Josie Aiello; Chicago, Illinois, U.S.
- Genres: Pop; jazz; R&B
- Occupation: Singer-songwriter
- Years active: 1984–present
- Member of: Chicago Catz
- Website: josieaiello.com

Josie Aiello is an American singer-songwriter originally from Chicago, Illinois. Her albums include Unkunvenshunal Girl, Where I Am, and Ashes to Beauty. She is known for her pop vocals on Music & Songs from Starlight Express, including the duet "Only You" with Peter Hewlett. She has recorded background vocals for numerous film soundtracks including Dinosaur, The Thing You Do, and The Guardian, and for musical artists such as Kenny Loggins, Cheryl Cole, Jennifer Lopez, and Ciara.

== Early life and education ==
Aiello got her start as a performer singing at her family's Sicilian restaurant, Cas and Lou's, in the north side of Chicago, where she worked from the age of nine. In 1978, she was featured in the Chicago Tribune, which described her as a "polished entertainer" at the age of twelve: "Josie's powerful singing voice – à la Barbra Streisand, her idol – is perfectly on key, filled with emotion and depth." In 1979, she starred as Baby June in a Northwestern University production of Gypsy. She graduated from The Chicago Academy for the Arts in 1984, with honors from the arts department, and attended DePaul University.

== Career ==
After moving to Los Angeles, California, she did session work, as well as voice-overs for radio station identification spots, and eventually began writing songs and singing background vocals. In 1987, Aiello recorded five songs for the MCA Records release of the Andrew Lloyd Webber original cast recording album Music & Songs from Starlight Express, including "Only You" with Peter Hewlett. She also recorded vocals for the soundtrack of the Francis Ford Coppola film Dear Me and a duet with Plácido Domingo. Other highlights included recording vocals for Kenny Loggins, and soundtracks for movies including South Park, The Out-of-Towners, To the Max, Dinosaur, The Thing You Do, and The Guardian.

In 2000, Quincy Jones signed her to his record label Qwest, a partnership with Warner Brothers Records, which released her debut album, Unkunvenshunal Girl, her unique take on contemporary dance-pop. The Qwest label shut down soon afterwards and Aiello had limited success despite touring with bands including 98 Degrees and Hootie & the Blowfish. In 2006, the Lady J label released her second album, Where I Am, featuring R&B-influences. Aiello resumed collaborative projects, and recorded mainly background vocals with artists including R. Kelly, Cheryl Cole, Jennifer Lopez, and Ciara. In 2015, her current record label, Breath of Life, released the single "Elevate" from her third album, Ashes to Beauty.

== Critical reception ==
Qwest positioned Aiello as "a nice fit between Tori Amos and Alanis Morissette, with the soul of Chaka Khan". Her debut album, Unkunvenshunal Girl, was noted for its "too cute title", and received mixed reviews. Noting that her influences included Barbra Streisand, Aretha Franklin, and Janis Joplin, the Los Angeles Times said, "Aiello has a Richter scale voice that should speak volumes", while The Daily Herald in Arlington Heights, Illinois, called her "a pop princess in the vein of Alanis Morissette". Meanwhile, The Morning Call in Allentown, Pennsylvania, said that "Aiello's mix of Oprah-esque positive reinforcement...and eager-to-please pop pandering has a familiar, bland taste, dare I say, as 'konvenshunal' as it gets." Unrated Magazine said that her second album, Where I Am, had the intensity of her first album, but "chills out vocals with music and incorporates neo-soul with hip-hop, Latin and world beat rhythms". Acknowledging that Where I Am was "more of a group project that one person's vision", Unrated stated, "Make no mistake, it's all Josie, but she is more like the conductor in this train ride."

== Discography ==
=== Albums ===
- 2000 – Unkunvenshunal Girl
- 2006 – Where I Am
- 2015 – Ashes to Beauty

=== Selected album appearances ===
- 1986: Taylor Street – Josie Falbo
- 1986: Save Tonight for Me – Chuck Mangione
- 1987: Music & Songs from Starlight Express [Original Cast Recording] – Andrew Lloyd Webber
- 1987: Simple Things – Richie Havens
- 1988: Intuition – Angela Bofill
- 1992: Designer's Original – Danniebelle Hall
- 1996: Blues, Dues & Love News – Ernestine Anderson
- 1998: Vuelve – Ricky Martin
- 1998: Stay Awhile – Steve Cole
- 1998: Crowe – Crowe
- 1999: Stratosphere – Jimmy Earl
- 1999: Somethin' Bout Love – Brian Culbertson
- 1999: Out of Towners – Marc Shaiman
- 1999: Open My Heart – Deborah Franco
- 2000: Shall We Dance? – Baila
- 2000: Nobody's Angel – Nobody's Angel
- 2001: On the Way to Love – Patti Austin
- 2001: 7 Years of Plenty – Louchie Lou & Michie One
- 2003: It's About Time – Kenny Loggins
- 2004: Broadway Favorites Collection – Andrew Lloyd Webber
- 2005: The 1st Chapter – Paul M.
- 2006: Halloween, Vol. 2: Creatures Collection – Mannheim Steamroller
- 2007: Double Up – R. Kelly
- 2008: Christmasville – Mannheim Steamroller
- 2012: Dance Again... the Hits – Jennifer Lopez
- 2012: A Million Lights – Cheryl Cole
- 2013: Closer to the Truth – Cher
- 2013: Ciara – Ciara
- 2014: Sweet Talker – Jessie J

=== Selected song appearances ===
- "AC/DC" (Andrew Lloyd Webber)
- "Alright"
- "Better with U"
- "Can This Be Love"
- "Dear You"
- "Drastic Measures"
- "Elevate"
- "Even If"
- "Everybody's Breakin'"
- "Extreeem"
- "Free"
- "Get Sommo"
- "Having a Bad Day"
- "Heavy Heart"
- "Inner Logic"
- "Into You"
- "Isn't It Romantic"
- "Let It Rain"
- "Let the Good Life (Lead to So Much Love)"
- "Little Boy Sweet"
- "Lotta Locomotion" (Andrew Lloyd Webber)
- "Love Yourself"
- "Make Up My Heart" (Andrew Lloyd Webber)
- "My Prayer"
- "My Way"
- "Myself"
- "Need to Be Lonely"
- "Only You" (Andrew Lloyd Webber)
- "Puerto Rican Boy"
- "Ready or Not"
- "Rebel Music"
- "Stop Lovin You"
- "Strong Enough"
- "The Call"
- "Till I Loved You"
- "Unkunvenshunal Girl"
- "Venom"
- "War"
- "Where I Am"
- "You Can Hear Me Now"

== Song covers by other artists ==
"Make Up My Heart"

- Reva Rice – Starlight Express: New London Cast Recording (1992)
- Sarah Brightman – Love Changes Everything (2005)
- Connie Fisher – Secret Love (2009)

== Filmography ==
Year	Title	Notes
1984	Body Rock	Vocals / singing
1985	Seven Minutes in Heaven	Vocals / singing
1996	That Thing You Do!	Vocalist
1999	The Out-of-Towners	Vocals / singing
2000	To the Max	Vocalist
2006	The Guardian	Singer – Chicago Catz
