= Steal Big Steal Little =

- Canadian theatrical release poster
- Directed by: Andrew Davis
- Screenplay by: Andrew Davis; Lee Blessing; Jeanne Blake; Terry Kahn
- Story by: Andrew Davis; Teresa Tucker-Davies; Frank Ray Perilli
- Starring: Andy García; Alan Arkin; Rachel Ticotin; Joe Pantoliano; Ally Walker; David Ogden Stiers; Kevin McCarthy; Richard Bradford
- Cinematography: Frank Tidy
- Edited by: Tina Hirsch
- Music by: William Olvis
- Production company: Chicago Pacific Entertainment
- Distributed by: Savoy Pictures
- Release date: September 29, 1995
- Running time: 135 minutes
- Country: United States
- Language: English
- Budget: $35 million
- Box office: $3,150,170 (US)

Steal Big Steal Little is a 1995 American comedy film directed by Andrew Davis and starring Andy García in dual roles. It also features Alan Arkin and Joe Pantoliano.

== Plot ==
Mild-mannered, unassuming Ruben Martinez has a slick, unscrupulous twin brother who now goes by the name Robby Martin. They were orphans raised by a rich landowner named Clifford Downey and his dancer wife, Mona Rowland-Downey.

Upon her death, Mona leaves her entire 40,000-acre (160 km^{2}) ranch in Santa Barbara, California in the care of only one son, Ruben. The other brother begins plotting how to win control of the property away from his estranged twin.

Ruben's main concern at the moment is that his wife Laura has left him. She cannot comprehend how her loving husband could have cheated on her with another woman.

Ruben tracks her to Chicago, where he meets used-car salesman Lou Perilli. He is assured that Laura will come back to him eventually. In the meantime, being pursued by a tough customer named Nick Zangaro about a debt he owes, Lou decides to make a quick getaway out west to Santa Barbara.

Eddie Agopian, a family lawyer, is in charge of watching over Ruben's interests. But suddenly he disappears. Local authorities, including Sheriff Otis and a corrupt judge, have begun harassing Ruben and the dozens of workers and friends who live at the ranch. They are the stooges of powerful businessman Reed Tyler, who has business interests with Ruben's brother, Robby.

Lou becomes a partner to the timid Ruben by promising to help him with his legal troubles. Lou has no lawyer experiences, but begins doing some investigating on Ruben's behalf and does the best he can in court. He also helps Ruben track down Eddie, who has absconded to Mexico with a stash of money.

A scam is exposed, revealing to Laura that it was not her husband who had relations with another woman but Robby, his evil twin. Ruben, Laura and Lou quickly hatch a scheme of their own, catching the sheriff and judge in compromising positions and luring Robby into one with the help of a couple of young women hired for the occasion.

The relationship between the brothers is healed a bit, if not completely, by the end as Ruben finds happiness at the ranch with his wide assortment of friends and family.

== Cast ==
- Andy García as:
  - Ruben Partida Martinez, Robby's identical twin brother
  - Robby Martin, Ruben's identical twin brother
- Alan Arkin as Lou Perilli
- Rachel Ticotin as Laura Martinez, Ruben's wife
- Joe Pantoliano as Eddie Agopian
- Ally Walker as Bonnie Martin, Robby's wife
- David Ogden Stiers as Judge Winton Myers
- Charles Rocket as Sheriff Otis
- Richard Bradford as Nick Zangaro
- Kevin McCarthy as Reed Tyler
- Tom Wood as Dan McCann
- Holland Taylor as Mona Rowland Downey, Clifford's wife
- Nathan Davis as Harry Lordly
- Mike Nussbaum as Sam Barlow
- Takaaki Ishibashi as Yoshi Takamura
- Dominik Garcia-Lorido as Maria Martinez, Ruben & Laura's daughter
- Natalija Nogulich as Alice
- Rita Taggart as Autumn McBride
- Victor Rivers as Sheriff Vic
- Andy Romano as Clifford Downey, Mona's husband
- Steven Robert Ross as Buzz, Tinker's identical twin brother
- Philip Arthur Ross as Tinker, Buzz's identical twin brother
- Candice Daly as Melissa

== Reception ==
The film received poor reviews from critics and was a box office failure. It holds a rating of 15% on Rotten Tomatoes.

== Production ==
Steal Big Steal Little was filmed on location at Rancho San Julian, Santa Barbara County, California.

== Home media ==
HBO released the film on VHS and later released it to DVD in 2004.

In 2022 the film was rereleased for rent or to purchase online at Andrew Davis Films.
