= Diamonds (1975 film) =

1975 Israeli-American heist film directed by Menahem Golan

- Original theatrical poster
- Directed by: Menahem Golan; Arik Dichner
- Written by: Menahem Golan; David Paulsen
- Produced by: Yoram Globus; Menahem Golan
- Starring: Robert Shaw; Richard Roundtree; Barbara Hershey; Shelley Winters
- Cinematography: Adam Greenberg
- Edited by: Dov Hoenig
- Music by: Roy Budd
- Distributed by: AVCO Embassy Pictures
- Release date: October 22, 1975 (U.S.)
- Running time: 120 minutes
- Countries: Israel; United States
- Language: English

Diamonds is a 1975 Israeli-American heist film directed by Menahem Golan and Arik Dichner. Robert Shaw stars in a dual role as twin brothers. Richard Roundtree, Barbara Hershey and Shelley Winters has supporting roles. The film was also released as Diamond Shaft, although it has no relation to the Shaft films other than having Roundtree in the cast.

== Plot ==
Charles Hodgson (Shaw) is a British aristocrat who decides to become a thief as a way of getting at his twin brother, Earl (Shaw), a security expert who has built a supposedly impregnable vault in Tel Aviv, which holds a cache of diamonds. For the caper, Charles enlists Archie (Roundtree), a heist expert, and Sally. He also becomes acquainted with an American woman, Zelda Shapiro (Winters), who is in Israel looking for a new husband.

== Cast ==
- Robert Shaw as Charles Hodgson / Earl Hodgson
- Richard Roundtree as Archie
- Barbara Hershey as Sally (credited as Barbara Seagull)
- Shelley Winters as Zelda Shapiro
- Shaike Ophir as Moshe
- Yosef Shiloach as Mustafa
- Gadi Yagil as Gaby
- Yehuda Efroni as Salzburg

== Production ==
=== Casting ===
Menahem Golan, the film's director, aimed to create an international picture with a foreign cast and in the English language, in the hopes of securing distribution beyond Israel. Golan met with veteran agent John Gaines in Hollywood to discuss casting English actor, Robert Shaw, who was in final negotiations to star End of the Game (1975). Upon reading the script, Gaines encouraged Golan to consider casting his other clients, Barbara Hershey and Richard Roundtree. Golan was interested in Hershey but was considering Michael York and David Hemmings for the role of Archie.

=== Filming ===
Golan and Dichner were inspired by the Israel Diamond Exchange in Tel Aviv and decided to shoot the film on location in Israel. Scenes were also filmed in London on Bond Street. Towards the end of filming, Shaw's actress wife Mary Ure died at their recently rented Mayfair home from an accidental overdose, and was discovered by Shaw.

== Reception ==
Film critic Roger Ebert gave the film two out of four stars in a review published by the Chicago Sun-Times on 1 January 1975. Ebert was impressed by the casting but felt that it did not hold up compared to masterpiece films from the heist film genre.

== See also ==
- List of American films of 1975
