= Tad Robinson =

American singer

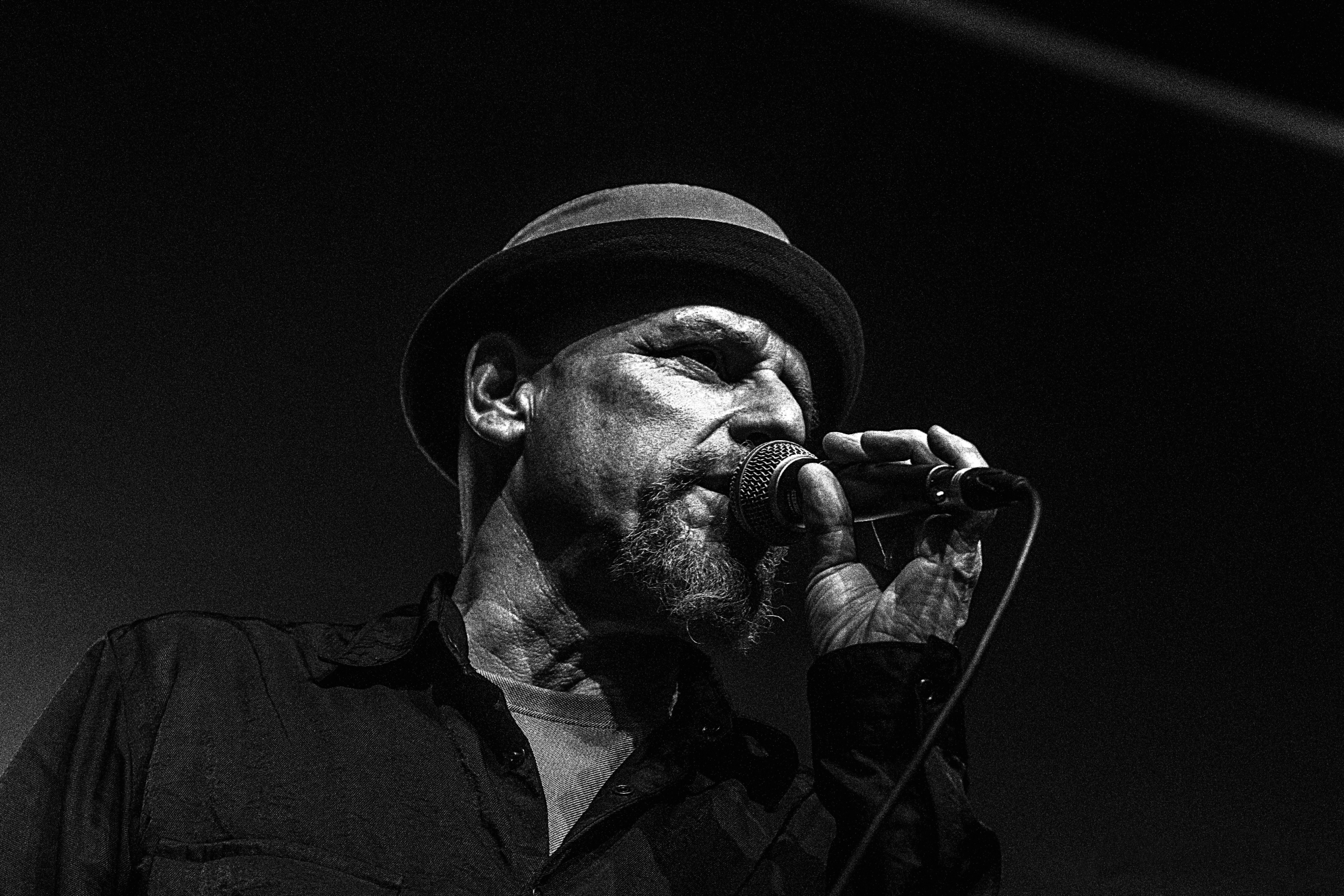
- Tad Robinson performing at Toulouse Tout (meaning all in English) Blues in Toulouse, France, April 2015

Background information
- Born: June 24, 1956 (age 69)
- Origin: New York City, US
- Genres: Blues
- Occupations: Singer-songwriter; musician
- Instruments: Vocals; harmonica
- Years active: 1989–present
- Labels: Severn Records, Delmark Records, Rounder Records
- Website: www.tadrobinson.com

Tad Robinson (born June 24, 1956) is an American singer, harmonica player, and songwriter.

Robinson was born in New York City and grew up there. He graduated from the New Lincoln School in Manhattan, New York and attended Indiana University's school of music in Bloomington before graduating in 1980. He played regionally with a group called the Hesitation Blues Band, then moved to Chicago, where he became the vocalist for Dave Specter & the Bluebirds, singing on their 1994 album Blueplicity for Delmark Records. In 1994, he released his first album under his own name on the same label; seven more have been released, five of those on the Severn imprint.

Robinson has performed at notable festivals in several countries including the US, Austria, Belgium, France, Germany, the Netherlands, and Switzerland. He has been a Hohner harmonica endorsee since 1985.

== Discography ==
Solo

- One to Infinity (Delmark Records, 1994)
- Last Go Round (Delmark, 1998)
- Did You Ever Wonder? (Severn Records, 2004)
- A New Point of View (Severn, 2007)
- Back in Style (Severn, 2010)
- Day Into Night (Severn, 2015)
- Real Street (Severn, 2019)
- Soul In Blue (Delmark Records, 2025)

With The Hesitation Blues Band

- Bring It in the Alley (Jelly Roll Records, 1979)

With Big Shoulders

- Big Shoulders (Rounder Records, 1989)

With Dave Specter & The Bluebirds

- Blueplicity (Delmark, 1994)
- Live in Europe (Delmark; CrossCut Records, 1994)
- Live in Chicago [CD and DVD] (Delmark, 2008)

With B.B. & The Blues Shacks

- Live at Lucerne Blues Festival, (Stumble Records, 1998)

With Lars Kutschke

- While We're Here, (Timezone Records, 2022)

Other releases

- Best Kept Secret – Blues Harmonica [with Mitch Kashmar, Mark DuFresne, Steve Bailey] (Thumbs Up Records, 2004)

Film work

- Under Siege (1992) - composer, "Sea of Blues," "Love You To Death," "Rap Mama Goose"; actor/performer (singer for 'Bad Billy & The Bail Jumpers')
- A Perfect Murder (1998) - performer, "Sands of Time"
- The Guardian (2006) - performer, "Hold Tight"

== Awards ==
- 2005 – W.C. Handy Blues Award, Soul Blues Album of the Year (nominated)
- 2005 – W.C. Handy Blues Award, Soul Blues Male Artist of the Year (nominated)
- 2008 – Blues Music Award, Soul Blues Album of the Year (nominated)
- 2008 – Blues Music Award, Soul Blues Male Artist of the Year (nominated)
- 2009 – Blues Music Award, Soul Blues Male Artist of the Year (nominated)
- 2011 – Blues Music Award, Soul Blues Album of the Year (nominated)
- 2011 – Blues Music Award, Soul Blues Male Artist of the Year (nominated)
- 2016 – Blues Music Award, Soul Blues Album of the Year (nominated)
