= Chicago Catz =

American cover band

- The Chicago Catz performing at a sold out show at House of Blues Chicago in 2003.

Background information
- Origin: Chicago, Illinois, United States
- Genres: R&B, rock, disco, pop music
- Years active: 1986–present
- Labels: unsigned
- Members: Richard "Richie" Peter Davis; Anthony "Downtown Tony" Brown; Wayne Stewart; Kevin Smith (musician); Mark Ohlsen; Devin Thompson; Josie Aiello; James A. Perkins, Jr. Tony "Toca" Carpenter; David Gross
- Website: http://www.chicagocatz.com/

Chicago Catz is a Chicago, Illinois area cover band that was formed in 1986 by five noteworthy musicians. Approaching their third decade, "The Catz", as they are affectionately known, have become one of the Windy City's most established professional R&B pop music bands. For more than 20 years, this group of notable professional musicians have performed at some of the most prestigious private parties and events in Chicago.

== Band history ==
During the late 70's and early 80's there were three hugely successful local bands in Chicago: R&B group "Third Rail" (later known as "Maxx Traxx"), Ska band "Heavy Manners", and blues act "Big Twist & the Mellow Fellows". Each band sold out night clubs, played college concerts and put out albums of original music. By day, the musicians were respected studio/session players. Jingle houses and album producers were always putting out the call for "those cats from Chicago". The stress from the "let's make records" grind and the competition from session work was enormous. Several of the guys from the three groups were longtime friends and had similar musical tastes, namely Richard "Richie" Peter Davis, Anthony "Downtown Tony" Brown, Wayne Stewart, Brian Danzy (pianist/keyboardist for the world-renowned Staples Singers, Lou Rawls, Patti LaBelle, Anita Baker, Art Porter, Brian Culbertson, Rick Braun, Nick Colionne) and Johnny Britt currently the Temptations' touring music director. These musicians grew up listening to R&B pop music. They thought that it would be fun to put together a high energy R&B pop dance band as a side project. It would create a nice change of pace from their daily business pressures and give them the opportunity to play together. Through their contacts, they knew they could pick up some club dates and "let their hair down" playing songs made famous by the likes of Stevie Wonder, James Brown, Marvin Gaye and other greats of the Motown era.

The musicians got together after their sessions and rehearsed for several months until the music was tight. During this time, word got out that the new band had formed. At their first appearance, devoted fans of former bands that these musicians had previous membership in, such as "Third Rail", "Maxx Traxx", "Heavy Manners" and "Big Twist & The Mellow Fellows", attended in large numbers. This resulted in the new band's instant success. "The Catz" primarily perform now at wedding, corporate, private and special events. They still play occasional club dates.

== Band members ==
The band currently comprises professional musicians Richard "Richie" Peter Davis on lead and rhythm guitar, Anthony "Downtown Tony" Brown on bass guitar and vocals, Wayne Stewart on drums and vocals, Kevin Smith (musician) on keyboards and vocals, Mark Ohlsen on trumpet, Devin Thompson on vocals, Josie Aiello on lead and background vocals, James A. Perkins, Jr. on saxophone and woodwinds, Tony "Toca" Carpenter on percussion, and David Gross on trombone.

== Appearances and Venues ==
=== Illinois ===
- Navy Pier Beer Garden (Chicago)

=== Outside of Illinois ===
Venues played outside of Illinois include:

- Capt'n Fun Beach Club (Pensacola Beach, Florida)

=== Festivals, Special Events, Corporate Functions ===
- Summer Dance 2010 weekday festivities at Jackson Park (Chicago) Beach Chicago, Illinois
- Summer Dance 2003 weekend festivities at Grant Park Chicago, Illinois
- Wedding receptions (only by special request)
- Annual McDonald's global convention /Orlando, Florida
- Annual McDonald's global convention /Atlantis Paradise Island-Nassau, Bahamas
- Annual McDonald's global convention /Cabo San Lucas, Mexico
- Annual McDonald's global convention /Boca Raton, Florida
- Tap National Sales Meeting/Las Vegas, Nevada
- Sheraton Hotels/San Diego, California
- Abbott Labs National Sales Meetings/Maui, Hawaii
- Abbott Labs National Sales Meetings/New Orleans, Louisiana
- Abbott Labs National Sales Meetings/Las Vegas, Nevada
- Quaker Oats Corporation
- Alltel National Sales Meeting/Little Rock, Arkansas
- Monsanto
- Wendy's National Sales Meeting/Chicago, Illinois
- BP Oil/Chicago, Illinois
- Sprint/Nextel
- Inner Circle
- Takeda
- Rotary International
- GE Healthcare

=== Media ===
The band has been featured live numerous times on Chicago television and have received air play on local radio. The band has also appeared in The Chicago Reader and Chicago Tribune newspapers.

The Chicago Catz are featured in the movie The Guardian as well as performing on the soundtrack for the movie Holes.

== Recordings ==
A DVD and long-awaited CD is currently in the works and the release dates have not yet been determined.

The Chicago Catz are featured on track number eleven of the Holes movie soundtrack album entitled: 11. Chicago Catz (Richard Davis) – "Happy Dayz"

== Awards and achievements ==
- In 1994, the Chicago Federation of Musicians presented its inaugural Living Art of Music Awards (LAMA) to deserving Chicago-based artist and groups. Nominees in the "Best Pop Group" category were Chicago, Richard Marx and the Chicago Catz.
