= Christmasville (album) =

Studio album by Mannheim Steamroller
- Released: October 7, 2008
- Recorded: 2008
- Genre: Christmas, symphonic pop
- Length: 30:38
- Label: American Gramaphone
- Producer: Chip Davis

Mannheim Steamroller chronology
Christmas Song (2007)	Christmasville (2008)	Christmas 25th Anniversary Collection (2009)

Mannheim Steamroller Christmas albums chronology
Christmas Song (2007)	Christmasville (2008)	Christmas 25th Anniversary Collection (2009)

Christmasville is Mannheim Steamroller's tenth Christmas album. It was released in 2008 on CD by American Gramaphone and features 13 Christmas songs. It contains a series of songs made for Universal Studios Florida for their "Grinchmas" event.

== Track listing ==
No.	Title	Writer(s)	Length
1.	"Christmasville Fanfare"	Arnie Roth	0:39
2.	"Messengers of Christmas" (Originally released on Christmas Celebration)	Chip Davis	3:29
3.	"Welcome Christmas" (from the original How the Grinch Stole Christmas!, featuring the Christmasville Singers)	Albert Hague (music), Dr. Seuss (lyrics)	2:33
4.	"You're a Mean One, Mr. Grinch" (from the original How the Grinch Stole Christmas!)	Hague, Dr. Seuss	2:16
5.	"Where Are You, Christmas?" (From the 2000 film How the Grinch Stole Christmas)	James Horner, Will Jennings, Mariah Carey	3:57
6.	"(Everybody's Waitin' for) The Man with the Bag" (Originally performed by Kay Starr in 1950)	Harold Stanley, Irving Taylor, Dudley Brooks	2:30
7.	"Something You Should Know"	Davis, Ed Wilson	3:46
8.	"Humbugs"	Davis, Bill Fries	1:48
9.	"The Fruitcake Song" (Featuring the Christmasville Singers)	Davis, Michael Roddy	1:00
10.	"The Sign of Love"	Davis, Wilson	3:59
11.	"Trim Up the Tree" (from the original How the Grinch Stole Christmas!, featuring the Christmasville Singers)	Hague, Dr. Seuss	1:30
12.	"Welcome Christmas (Reprise)" (from the original How the Grinch Stole Christmas!, featuring the Christmasville Singers)	Hague, Dr. Seuss	3:11
Total length:			30:38

== Personnel ==
- Chip Davis - Recorders, Drums, Arranger, Audio Engineer, Audio Production, Composer, Cover Illustration, Design, Engineer, Liner Notes, Producer
- Arnie Roth- Arranger, Composer, Concert Master, Violin
- Brian Ackley - Audio Engineer, Engineer
- Josie Aiello - Soloist, Vocals
- David Cwirko - Audio Engineer, Engineer
- Stephen Eisen - Saxophone (Tenor)
- Jeremy Kahn - Piano
- Larry Kohut - Bass guitar
- Craig McCreary - Guitar
- Paul Mertens - Sax (Baritone)
- Gene Nery - Soloist, Vocals
- Gene Pokorny - Tuba
- Matthew Prock - Audio Engineer, Engineer
- Mike Smith - Alto saxophone
- Joel Spencer - Drum Set, Drums
- Charles Vernon - Bass Trombone
- Cheryl Wilson - Soloist, Vocals
- Cello - Mark Brandfonbrener, Judy Stone
- French horns - Jonathan Boen, Oto Carrillo, Alice Render-Clevenger, Dale Clevenger, Alice Render
- Horns - Michael Buckwalter, Melanie Cottle, Neil Kimel
- Percussion - Joel Cohen, Doug Wadell
- Trombone - Scott Bentall, Mark Fisher (tenor), Mark Fry, Fritz Hocking, Mick Mulcahy (tenor)
- Trumpets - Matthew Comerford, Randall Carey Deadman, David Inmon, Rob Parton, Channing Philbrick, Mark Ridenour
- Viola - Pat Brennan, Guillaume Combet, Claudia Lasareff-Mironoff, Frank Babbitt
- Violins - Lori Ashikawa, Kathleen Brauer, Jennifer Cappelli, Larry Glazer, Carol Lahti, Clara Lindner, Michael Shelton
- The Christmasville Singers are: Jeffrey Morrow, Josie Falbo, Judy Storey & Robert Bowker
