= Andrew Davis (director) =

American filmmaker (born 1946)

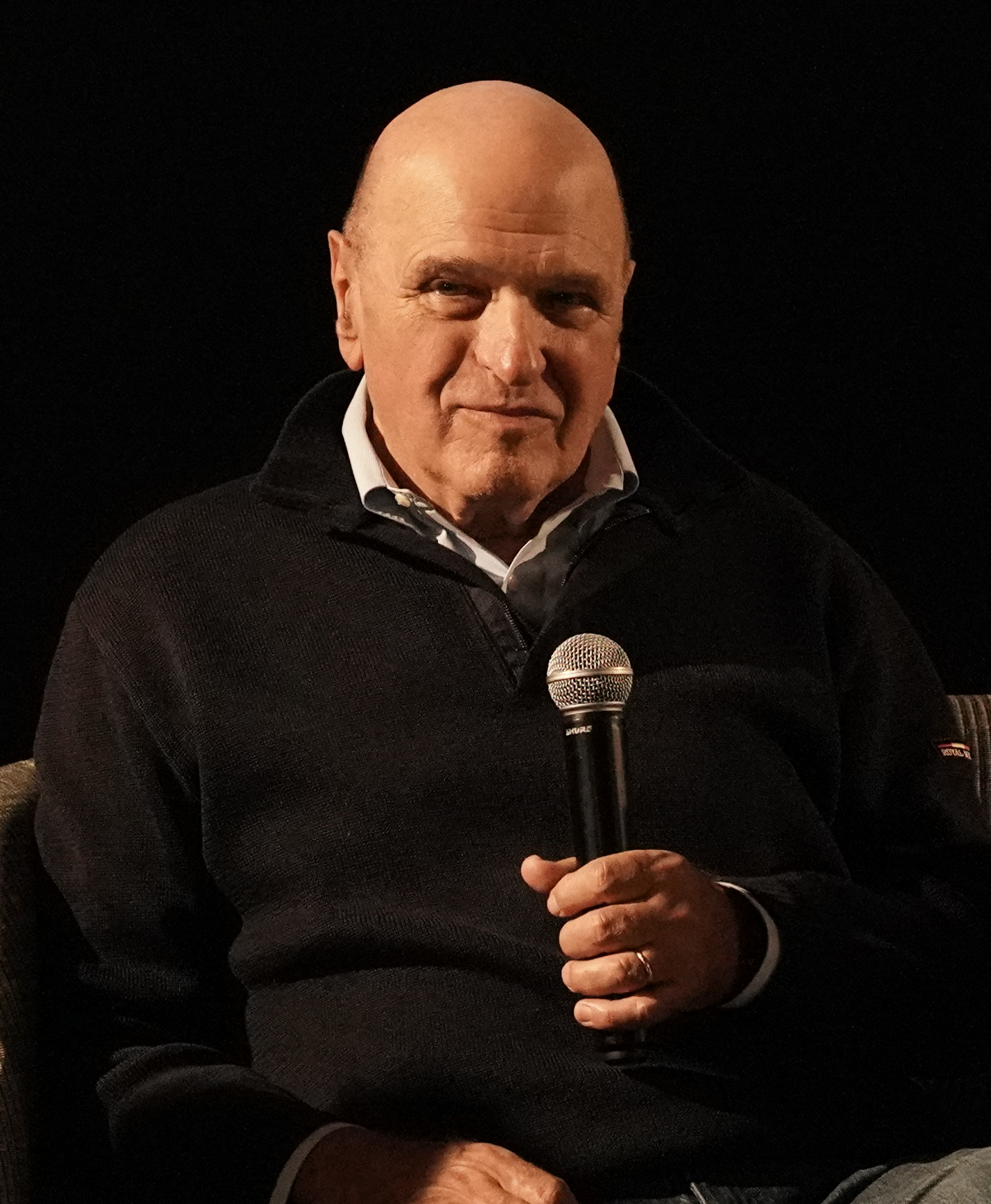
- Davis in 2024
- Born: November 21, 1946 (age 79); Chicago, Illinois, U.S.
- Education: University of Illinois at Urbana-Champaign (B.A., 1968)
- Occupations: Film director, producer, screenwriter, cinematographer
- Years active: 1969–present
- Father: Nathan Davis
- Relatives: Richie Davis (brother)
- Website: www.andrewdavisfilms.com

Andrew Davis (born November 21, 1946) is an American film director, producer, screenwriter, and cinematographer. He is best known for having directed several successful action and thriller films during the 1980s and 1990s.

Davis' notable works include the Code of Silence (1985) starring Chuck Norris; Steven Seagal vehicles Above the Law (1988) and Under Siege (1992); The Fugitive (1993) with Harrison Ford; Chain Reaction (1996); A Perfect Murder (1998); and Holes (2003). Davis was nominated for a Golden Globe Award and a Directors Guild of America Award for his work on The Fugitive.

== Early life and education ==
Davis was born on the south side of Chicago, Illinois, and has directed several films using Chicago as a backdrop. He is the son of actor Nathan Davis and Metta Davis, and the brother of musician Richard "Richie" Peter Davis (co-founder of the cover band Chicago Catz) and Jo Ellen Friedman. Davis had his father fill out many character roles throughout the years, notably as the grandfather to Shia LaBeouf's character in the Disney film Holes. Davis' paternal grandparents were Romanian Jewish immigrants.

After attending the Harand Camp of the Theater Arts summer camp program and Bowen High School, Davis went on to study journalism at the University of Illinois at Urbana-Champaign where he was issued a degree in journalism in 1968. It was not long before his interest in civil rights and anti-war issues converged with his growing interest in filmmaking.

Davis was mentored by cinematographer and director Haskell Wexler, who employed him as a camera assistant on his 1969 film Medium Cool. Wexler and Davis reunited in 2014 to discuss the film before a screening at the Pollock Theater on the campus of the University of California, Santa Barbara.

== Career ==
=== 1969–1978: early works to directorial breakthrough ===
Davis worked as a director of photography for the films Cool Breeze (1972), Private Parts (1972), Hit Man (1972), and The Slams (1973), for B-movie producer Gene Corman.

In 1975, Davis was credited for his writing, cinematography, and producing for the family film Paco, directed by Robert Vincent O'Neil and starring José Ferrer and Allen Garfield. Also in 1975, Davis was the director of photography for Menahem Golan's Lepke.

Afterwards he worked on two Charles Band films Mansion of the Doomed (1976) as cinematographer, and Crash! (1977) as director of photography.

On this period of his life Davis said:

"When I went to work for Gene Corman for Cool Breeze, Hit Man, Private Parts, and The Slams, they had small $300,000 budgets or less. It allowed me to see what it took to make a movie. I worked with first time directors, learned with them, and could recommend things, so I was able to get my hands in the works. Everybody was a character. When I worked with Menahem Golan for Lepke, I got to shoot in 35mm anamorphic Panavision and Tony Curtis was a big actor. There were fancy sets and arclights, so it was a big deal for me. I worked on some other really small movies with Charles Band like Crash! and Mansion of the Doomed. I did this because I wanted to see what it was like to make a movie for very little money. This allowed me to later say ‘let’s try to make Stony Island’."

In 1978, Davis released his directorial debut his semi-biographical musical drama film Stony Island. The genesis of the film came about while Davis was working on Lepke a few years earlier, when he met one of its screenwriters, Tamar Hoffs, also from Chicago, and they bonded over having musicians as brothers and a shared nostalgia for their hometown's atmosphere. Davis explains "I wanted to make a film that was to me what Mean Streets was to Martin Scorsese and American Graffiti was to George Lucas, a film about my roots, I wanted to make a film about what it was like to grow up in Chicago as a musician. It's important to show black and white kids working together. You can't even draw lines anymore between blacks and whites, musically." He added that "after Lepke I flew to Chicago and spent about three months with my brother and his friends. He's the last white kid on the block." Once in Chicago, Davis followed his brother Richie Davis, a guitarist, and his friend Edward 'Stony' Robinson, a singer, who would go on to play the leads. Davis recorded, and photographed the pair hanging out with their musician friends. After compiling a slideshow, he presented it to Hoffs, and together they decided to make a film about Chicago musicians.

Stony Island centered on young musicians forming a band in their impoverished south side neighborhood. The film co-stars include veteran musicians Gene Barge and Ronnie Barron, as well as Dennis Franz, Rae Dawn Chong, Meshach Taylor, and Susanna Hoffs. After completion, the film was screened in art houses and urban cinemas. Stony Island was praised by critics as a vibrant, heartfelt debut that captures the essence of Chicago's late-’70s culture and music scene. Critics praised its authentic portrayal of the city’s neighborhoods and its blend of urban grit with a soulful, semi-documentary feel. The film’s story of a biracial band forming against a backdrop of changing neighborhoods resonates with themes of integration and ambition. Featuring natural performances by real musicians and a jazzy, energetic soundtrack, the movie balances personal moments, raw emotion, and cultural commentary with charm and sincerity, solidifying its legacy as a vivid portrait of its time and place. Davis recouped two-thirds of the budget and started gaining interest from film studios for urban-themed projects.

=== 1979–1985: continued career and action film breakthrough ===
Moving forward, Davis was credited as director of photography for the film Hot Rod (1979), Over the Edge (1979), and Angel (1983). He was a second unit cinematographer on Robert Downey Sr.'s 1980 film Up the Academy.

In 1983, Davis directed a horror film titled The Final Terror, about young campers navigating a remote forest stalked by a deadly presence. Davis explained that screenwriter Ronald Shusett, impressed by his previous work, recommended him for the film. He added that producer Joe Roth also hired him as the cinematographer, crediting him under the pseudonym 'Andreas Davidescu' to bypass union restrictions. Davis explained that before filming, he and Roth scouted various locations, including the Mount St. Helens area in Washington. He stated that most of the cast, which includes John Friedrich, Rachel Ward, Daryl Hannah, Adrian Zmed, Mark Metcalf, Akosua Busia, and Joe Pantoliano, were relatively inexperienced or new to acting. According to Davis, Australian actress Rachel Ward was cast as the lead after he saw a modeling portrait of her in Roth's office. He also recalled that Pantoliano secured his role after arriving at the audition in character, impressing him with his commitment. Davis noted that the film was completed in 1981 but struggled to find a distributor due to its low body count. He explained that, as a result, two additional murders were filmed without his authorization. The later rise to fame of several cast members helped the film secure a distributor, and it was released in October 1983. In the intervening years, the film has developed a cult following.

Also in 1983, Davis was hired to direct and co-write Beat Street, a rap musical showcasing breakdancing and the street music culture of early 1980s New York City. However, during filming, reports emerged that Davis was replaced due to 'creative differences' but they kept his writing credit. Davis said that afterward producer "Mike Medavoy looked at the footage and said ‘there’s nothing wrong with this footage. I like this footage, and I’m going to hire this guy to do an action movie.’"

On October 2, 1984, Davis began principal photography on his action film debut, Code of Silence, which was shot in Chicago at his recommendation. It stars martial artist-turned-actor Chuck Norris. At the time, Norris was primarily known for leading roles in martial arts films, making Code of Silence a departure due to its complexity and dramatic depth. The film is about a cop who is ostracized for refusing to support a corrupt cop who killed an innocent bystander, while protecting the daughter of a mob boss. Davis described Norris as "easy to work with and very supportive." Released by Orion Pictures on May 3, 1985, and received generally positive reviews, with critics praising its slick direction, strong performances, and engaging action. It was regarded as a standout in Norris's career, with many considering it his best film to date. Ric Burrous of the Daily Journal said "Davis deserves a lot of credit for the success of 'Code.' While Norris handles his acting chores well, it's Davis who keeps the whole story flowing with the kind of street-wise rhythm that fits the mood of Chicago's seamier side of life. He keeps Norris's penchant for karate fight scenes to a minimum, making them a small part of the picture rather than the climax they have been in such other Norris films." The film debuted at number 1 with an opening weekend gross of $5.5 million and ultimately earned a total of $20.3 million at the US box office. Davis credits the film's success with establishing him as an action film director.

=== 1986–1993: major successes and wide recognition ===
Davis co-wrote, produced and directed a film titled Above the Law for Warner Bros. in 1988. This film is most notable for being the feature film debut of Steven Seagal. Davis then went back to Orion with his project The Package, working with Gene Hackman and Tommy Lee Jones.

Davis brought Jones with him to his next project, which was originally titled Dreadnaught but eventually carried the title Under Siege. In the picture Davis re-teamed with Seagal to create the top grossing fall film of 1992.

His 1993 film The Fugitive received seven Academy Award nominations including Best Picture, while Jones won for Best Supporting Actor, which is his only Oscar win to date. The Academy ultimately gave the 1993 Best Picture award to Schindler's List. That year Davis was also honored with a Golden Globe nomination for Best Director by the Hollywood Foreign Press. The Directors Guild of America nominated him for Outstanding Directorial Achievement in Theatrical Direction.

Roger Ebert reviewed The Fugitive in 1993. He commented: "Andrew Davis' The Fugitive is one of the best entertainments of the year, a tense, taut and expert thriller that becomes something more than that, an allegory about an innocent man in a world prepared to crush him." Ebert observed that "Davis paints with bold visual strokes" and that he "transcends genre and shows an ability to marry action and artistry that deserves comparison with Hitchcock, yes, and also with David Lean and Carol Reed."

=== 1995–2019: subsequent films ===
Davis continued directing big budget adventures throughout the 1990s including Steal Big Steal Little, Chain Reaction, and A Perfect Murder.

In the fall of 2001, Davis was set to release Warner Bros. Pictures' Collateral Damage starring Arnold Schwarzenegger. However, the initial release date was pushed in an effort to be sensitive to the tragedies of 9/11, as the film's plot and content too closely echoed the tragedy. The film was finally released theatrically in 2002.

In 2003, Davis directed Holes, an adaptation of Louis Sachar's book by the same name, for Walt Disney Pictures starring Shia LaBeouf, Sigourney Weaver, Patricia Arquette, Tim Blake Nelson, and Jon Voight. The film is about a boy who is sent to a mysterious juvenile detention camp where he uncovers buried secrets. Davis chose to direct Holes to show he was capable of making more than action films such as The Fugitive and Collateral Damage. He encouraged author Sachar to participate in the production and adapt the novel into a screenplay. To break down the novel's action into a film, Davis and Sachar storyboarded over 100 scenes on 3-by-5 note cards, each of which had specific time allotments. Sachar said Davis "went through and said, 'Now as you rewrite it, this card should take half a minute, this one should take three minutes, this one should take one minute, and so on.'" The film went on to receive favorable reviews. A.O. Scott's review in The New York Times called it "the best film released by an American studio so far this year". In the US the film grossed $67,406,573 theatrically, and $56.2 million on home video.

Davis filmed the Touchstone Pictures feature film, The Guardian in 2006. The film focuses on the Rescue Swimmers of the U.S. Coast Guard and stars Kevin Costner and Ashton Kutcher. Costner plays a legendary rescue swimmer who returns to the training facility to bring up the next generation of swimmers, including a rescue swimmer played by Kutcher. Production was halted when the film's New Orleans location was ravaged by Hurricane Katrina. The real-life Coast Guard advisers on the film were immediately deployed to rescue victims of the storm.

=== 2020 to present: current work ===
In 2020, Davis released his documentary Mentors—Toni & Santi at the Santa Barbara International Film Festival. It is the relationship between two renowned photographers, Santi Visalli, 87, and Tony Vaccaro, 97, characterized by friendship and a mentor-protégé dynamic. Davis made Mentors: Tony & Santi as a labor of love, After an encounter where Visalli credited Vaccaro as a pivotal influence on his life. It moved Davis, who recognized the opportunity to explore not only their relationship but also the broader themes of mentorship and creativity. With access to their vast photographic archives, Davis crafted a documentary that celebrates their personal and professional journeys while reflecting on the profound impact of mentorship on art. Matt Fagerholm of RogerEbert.com called it "a gem" and explained that Davis enriches Mentors with endearing moments of the subjects' personalities, like playful banter and lighthearted remarks, instead of being strictly biographical. Fagerholm also pointed out the opening, and said that Davis powerfully captures the emotional warmth of a reunion between two friends and collaborators.

In April 2024 in France at the Reims Polar Film Festival, Davis was the guest of honor with a career tribute ceremony. Stony Island was also featured at the 25th anniversary of Ebertfest in Champaign Illinois in April 2024 featuring a live performance by the films costar and Davis’ brother Richie Davis, and his band, The Chicago Catz.

In 2024, Davis published his first novel, which he co-wrote with Jeff Biggers, named Disturbing the Bones. The book is a political thriller about a scheme to sabotage a global peace summit in Chicago, intersecting with a civil rights case tied to an archaeological discovery. Davis explained that the concept of the story "started as a screenplay and based upon the archaeological dig that I had heard about many years ago, where it one site they found 26 layers going back 13,000 years. And then when I did The Package, it triggered me (to wonder) what we would be remembered as. When everything is gone, we’ll have our missile silos and our bunkers under the ground." On working with Biggers and how the screenplay became a novel, Davis added "Jeff and I met 10 years ago and I had been thinking about this for maybe 15 or 20 years in terms of just the setting and the story and the dynamics. And I, and so we started working on a screenplay and decided that we wanted to put so much in it, let's write the novel and then we'll extract the best for the screenplay." The book received positive reception, with particular praise for its suspense, characterization, and social commentary. Chicagoan filmmaker Michael Mann, a contemporary of Davis, gave it high praise and said it is “a knife-edged investigation that morphs into a political thriller about a world on the brink. An ingenious page turner.”

== Filmography ==
Year	Title	Functioned as				Notes
Year	Title	Director	Producer	Writer	DoP.	Notes
1975	Paco	No	Associate	Yes	Yes	
1978	Stony Island	Yes	Yes	Yes	No	Directorial Debut
1983	The Final Terror	Yes	No	No	No	
1985	Code of Silence	Yes	No	No	No	
1988	Above the Law	Yes	Yes	Yes	Additional	
1989	The Package	Yes	Co-producer	No	No	
1992	Under Siege	Yes	No	No	No	
1993	The Fugitive	Yes	No	No	No	
1995	Steal Big Steal Little	Yes	Yes	Yes	No	
1996	Chain Reaction	Yes	Yes	No	No	
1998	A Perfect Murder	Yes	No	No	No	
2002	Collateral Damage	Yes	No	No	No	
2003	Holes	Yes	Yes	No	No	
2006	The Guardian	Yes	No	No	No	
2020	Mentors - Tony & Santi	Yes	No	Yes	No	Documentary

=== Director of photography only ===
Year	Title	Director	Notes
1972	Cool Breeze	Barry Pollack	
1972	Private Parts	Paul Bartel	
1972	Hit Man	George Armitage	
1973	The Slams	Jonathan Kaplan	
1975	Lepke	Menahem Golan	
1976	Mansion of the Doomed	Michael Pataki	
1976	The Stronger	Lee Grant	Short film
1977	Crash!	Charles Band	
1979	Over the Edge	Jonathan Kaplan	
1979	Hot Rod	George Armitage	
1980	Up the Academy	Robert Downey Sr.	Second unit only
1984	Angel	Robert Vincent O'Neil	

=== Documentary works ===
Year	Title	Director	Producer	Writer	Notes
2020	Mentors - Tony & Santi	Yes	No	Yes	Documentary

==== Director of photography only ====
Year	Title	Director	Notes
2013	Four Days in Chicago	Haskell Wexler	Additional photography

== Bibliography ==
- Disturbing the Bones - With Jeff Biggers

== Awards and honors ==
Institution	Year	Category	Work	Result
Chicago Film Critics Association	1994	Best Director	The Fugitive	Nominated
Chicago International Film Festival	1978	Gold Hugo	Stony Island	Nominated
Directors Guild of America Awards	1994	Outstanding Directing – Feature Film	The Fugitive	Nominated
Golden Globe Awards	1994	Best Director	The Fugitive	Nominated

== Sources ==
- Davis, Andrew (2014). The Final Terror (Blu-ray audio commentary). Scream Factory.
