= Collateral Damage (2002 film) =

2002 film by Andrew Davis

- Theatrical release poster
- Directed by: Andrew Davis
- Written by: David Griffiths; Ronald Roose
- Produced by: Steven Reuther; David Foster
- Starring: Arnold Schwarzenegger; Elias Koteas; Francesca Neri; Cliff Curtis; John Leguizamo; John Turturro
- Cinematography: Adam Greenberg
- Edited by: Dov Hoenig; Dennis Virkler
- Music by: Graeme Revell
- Production company: Bel-Air Entertainment
- Distributed by: Warner Bros. Pictures
- Release dates: February 4, 2002 (Premiere); February 8, 2002 (United States)
- Running time: 108 minutes
- Country: United States
- Languages: English; Spanish
- Budget: $85 million
- Box office: $78.4 million

Collateral Damage is a 2002 American vigilante action-thriller film directed by Andrew Davis and starring Arnold Schwarzenegger, Elias Koteas, Francesca Neri, Cliff Curtis, John Leguizamo, and John Turturro. The film follows Los Angeles firefighter Gordy Brewer (Schwarzenegger) who seeks to avenge his son's and wife's deaths at the hands of a guerrilla commando by traveling to Colombia and facing his family's killers.

Collateral Damage was released in the United States by Warner Bros. Pictures on February 8, 2002, to negative reviews and was a box-office bomb grossing $78.4 million worldwide against a production budget of $85 million.

== Plot ==
A bomb detonates in the plaza of the Colombian Consulate building in Los Angeles, killing nine people, including Colombian officials in a caravan, and American intelligence agents. Among the civilians killed are the wife and son of an LAFD firefighter, Captain Gordy Brewer, who is injured in the aftermath. A video is sent to the U.S. State Department, in which the masked El Lobo ("The Wolf") claims responsibility, justifying it as retaliation for the US oppression of Colombia. The FBI believes El Lobo is a Colombian terrorist named Claudio Perrini.

CIA Officer Peter Brandt, the Colombia Station Chief, is harshly reprimanded for the incident by a Senate Oversight Committee, which promptly terminates all CIA operations there. Brandt angrily returns to Mompós and meets with his paramilitary allies to plan a major offensive to take down Claudio.

Frustrated with the political red tape regarding the investigation, Brewer travels to Mompós to personally hunt down Claudio, but is quickly arrested for illegal entry. The guerrillas stage a prison uprising to free their comrades and abduct Brewer, demanding a large ransom for him. Brandt's unit is alerted to Brewer's presence in Colombia but arrive too late. Brewer breaks out of the prison, evades capture, and secures a guerrilla zone pass from Canadian mechanic Sean Armstrong. Armstrong introduces him to drug runner Felix Ramirez, the manager of the cocaine distribution facility financing the guerrillas.

Masquerading as a mechanic, Brewer rigs several improvised explosives, destroying the facility. Felix is blamed for the drug plant's destruction, and so is executed in front of a hiding Brewer's eyes. Brewer infiltrates Claudio's headquarters and plants a bomb to kill him but is captured when he tries to prevent a woman, Selena, from being caught in the blast radius along with her son, Mauro.

At Claudio's home compound, Selena reveals she is Claudio's wife. She and Claudio once lost their own child during an American attack, which compelled Claudio to become a terrorist; Selena found and adopted Mauro, whose parents were killed in the attack. Regardless, Selena eventually sympathizes with Brewer and reveals Claudio is planning another bombing in Washington, D.C. Meanwhile, Brandt's unit locates Claudio's compound and launches an attack. During the ensuing shootout, Selena helps free Brewer and, along with Brandt, travels back to the State Department in Washington, D.C., to help the search effort for Claudio. Selena identifies Union Station as the target, and the FBI investigates.

Supposedly needing the lavatory, Selena excuses herself from the command room and becomes irritated when Mauro refuses to accompany her. After Brewer sees Selena make the same gesture as the masked El Lobo in the video, he realizes that she was the Wolf all along, with Claudio serving as her figurehead, and the entire motive behind their cause is personal revenge for their daughter's death at the hands of the US. Furthermore, Brewer surmises the real target is the State Department, and Selena had used him to get past the building's security. He quickly throws Mauro's bomb-laden toy dinosaur out a window seconds before it explodes. Selena then murders a federal agent, taking her duty piece and identification card. Brandt, realizing Brewer's suspicions, is shot and killed by Selena while trying to stop her from fleeing the building.

Brewer chases Selena to the building's underground parking, where she and Claudio ride off through the tunnels on a motorcycle. Brewer finds the tunnel control console and closes the gates, preventing their escape. He uses an axe to rupture some gas lines along the walls of the tunnel and, as they ride back, Selena shoots at Brewer, unwittingly igniting the gas. Brewer jumps through a doorway just as the entire tunnel explodes. The couple survives the blast, however, and attacks Brewer simultaneously. After a short hand-to-hand fight, Brewer kills Selena by tossing her to the control panel's exposed circuitry which she was electrocuted, and kills Claudio by throwing an axe at his chest just before Claudio can detonate another bomb in the State Department, avenging the death of his wife and son.

In the aftermath, Brewer carries Mauro in his arms as they leave the State Department. A newscast voiceover explains that Brewer receives the Presidential Medal of Freedom for preventing one of the worst terrorist attacks in U.S. history; however, he declines all attempts by the press to speak with him.

== Cast ==
- Arnold Schwarzenegger as Captain Gordon "Gordy" Brewer, a Los Angeles firefighter who seeks Colombian terrorists responsible for the killing of his wife and son.
- Francesca Neri as Selena Perrini, the wife of Claudio.
- Elias Koteas as Peter Brandt, the head of the CIA station of Colombia.
- Cliff Curtis as Claudio "El Lobo" Perrini, a Colombian terrorist known as the Wolf.
- John Leguizamo as Felix Ramirez, the manager of cocaine distribution facility.
- John Turturro as Sean Armstrong, a Canadian mechanic.
- Lindsay Frost as Anne Brewer, Gordy's wife.
- Ethan Dampf as Matt Brewer, Gordy's son.
- Miguel Sandoval as FBI Special Agent Joe Phipps, the FBI agent in charge.
- Harry Lennix as FBI Agent Dray, Phipps's FBI partner
- Jane Lynch as Agent Russo
- Tyler Posey as Mauro, the adopted son of Selena and Claudio.
- Fernando Sarfati as Federale
- Jsu Garcia as Roman, Claudio's right-hand man.
- Michael Milhoan as Jack, Gordy's fellow fireman.
- Rick Worthy as Ronnie, Gordy's fellow fireman.
- Raymond Cruz as Junior, Gordy's fellow fireman.
- J. Kenneth Campbell as Ed Coonts, the former military advisor of Colombia who gives Brewer advice to survive Colombia.
- Jossara Jinaro as Rosetta
- Rodrigo Obregón as Rodrigo
- Michael Cavanaugh as Chairman Paul Devereaux
- Nicholas Pryor as Senator Delich
- Pedro Damián as River Rat

== Production ==
The original script for the film had the same plotline but would have addressed American policy in the Middle East by taking place in Libya; director Davis and his screenwriters chose Colombia as the new location because it had not been used as extensively and touched on a current geopolitical conflict area.

The film was shot in Los Angeles, New York and Washington, D.C. The scenes that represent Colombia were shot in the town of Coatepec and Xalapa in the state of Veracruz, Mexico. Filming in Mexico lasted ten weeks.

== Release ==
=== Marketing ===
The September 11 attacks affected the release and editing of the final film. The film's original trailer was scrapped because it showed a major bomb attack in the United States. The film was originally scheduled to be released on October 5, 2001, but it was postponed due to its terrorism theme and the attacks. Following this, Warner Bros. removed any mentions of Collateral Damage from the website, radio stations, television and movie theaters. All trailers and posters for the film were also recalled. Eventually, it was released on February 8, 2002. The premiere was held four days earlier. Collateral Damage was also supposed to include Colombian actress Sofía Vergara in the role of an airplane hijacker; however the scene where Vergara would hijack a plane was cut from the film.

=== Home media ===
Warner Home Video released the film on DVD and VHS in the United States on July 30, 2002.

On April 7, 2009, a Blu-ray version of the film was released.

== Reception ==
=== Box office ===
Collateral Damage earned a total of $15.2 million during its opening weekend. It ranked number one at the box office ahead of Big Fat Liar, Rollerball and Black Hawk Down. This was also the first Arnold Schwarzenegger film to do so since Batman & Robin in 1997. For its second weekend, the film dropped into fifth place behind John Q., Crossroads, Return to Never Land and Big Fat Liar, making $8.7 million. In Spain, it opened in second place behind Monsters, Inc. with $1.1 million in its first weekend. The film also collected $623,585 during its opening weekend in the UK, ranking fifth below Blade II, Ice Age, Ali G Indahouse and Crossroads. The film made $78.4 million worldwide against its $85 million budget.

=== Critical response ===
Rotten Tomatoes, rated it 19% based on reviews from 141 critics, with an average rating of 4/10. The site's consensus reads: "Despite its timely subject matter, Collateral Damage is an unexceptional and formulaic action thriller." Metacritic rated it 33 out of 100 based on reviews from 34 critics. Audiences polled by CinemaScore gave the film an average grade of "B" on an A+ to F scale.

Desson Howe of The Washington Post called the film "head-scratchingly ordinary" and wrote, "Even by the fast-and-loose standards of action filmmaking, Collateral Damage is a disappointment." Claudia Puig of USA Today said, "It's laughably unbelievable, yet it's hard to snicker at anything involving terrorists, even Collateral's obscure Colombian variety. What we get is simply another opportunity for Schwarzenegger — who seems to be in perpetual Terminator mode — to flex his muscles." Roger Ebert of the Chicago Sun-Times awarded the film three out of four stars and described it as "a skillfully made example of your typical Schwarzenegger action film".

== See also ==
- List of American films of 2002
- Arnold Schwarzenegger filmography
