= Stony Island (film) =

- Original theatrical poster
- Directed by: Andrew Davis
- Written by: Tamar Simon Hoffs; Andrew Davis
- Starring: Richard Davis; Edward "Stoney" Robinson; Gene Barge; George Englund; Susanna Hoffs
- Cinematography: Tak Fujimoto
- Edited by: Dov Hoenig
- Music by: David Matthews
- Distributed by: World Northal
- Release date: 1978
- Running time: 97 minutes
- Country: United States
- Language: English
- Budget: $380,000

Stony Island is a 1978 American musical drama film directed by Andrew Davis (in his directorial debut), and written by Davis and Tamar Simon Hoffs. The movie stars Richard Davis, the director's brother, and Edward "Stoney" Robinson. The co-stars include Dennis Franz, Rae Dawn Chong, Gene Barge, and Susanna Hoffs.

The film is about an up-and-coming rhythm and blues band in Chicago. Set in various places in Chicago, including gritty Stony Island Avenue.

Director, Andrew Davis drew inspiration for Stony Island from his brother’s experience growing up in a changing South Side Chicago neighborhood and forming a band with local kids. Made on a modest budget of under $380,000, it was distributed by World Northal, the film lost money, recovering only two-thirds of its budget, but sparked Davis’ career as a sought-after director for urban-themed films.

Stony Island has been praised as a vibrant, heartfelt debut that captures the essence of Chicago's late-’70s culture and music scene. Critics commend its authentic portrayal of the city’s neighborhoods and semi-documentary feel, as it features real performances by jazz musicians.

== Cast ==
- Richard Davis as Richie Bloom
- Edward "Stoney" Robinson as Kevin Tucker
- Gene Barge as Percy Price
- George Englund Jr. as Harold Tate
- Nathan Davis as Lewis Moss
- Oscar Brown as Alderman Waller
- Ronnie Barron as Ronnie Roosevelt
- Tennyson Stephens as Tennyson
- Windy Barnes as Windy
- Rae Dawn Chong as Janetta
- Criss Johnson as Criss
- Dennis Franz as Jerry Domino
- Susanna Hoffs as Lucie
- Meshach Taylor as Alderman's Yes-Man

== Production and release ==
During the mid-1970s, Davis was a rising cinematographer; according to him, during this time he was hired to work on important films, but also chose to work on low-budget films because he "wanted to see what it was like to make a movie for very little money. This allowed me to later say ‘let’s try to make Stony Island’."

Director Davis explained that the inspiration for"Stony Island was a story about my brother growing up in the south side of Chicago. I also grew up there, but it was really about his journey in a neighborhood that was changing. My parents had stayed in this neighborhood, and my brother was putting together a band with some other kids."

Davis co-wrote the film with Tamar Simon Hoffs, and the cast includes Davis's brother Richard Davis, Gene Barge, Rae Dawn Chong, Susanna Hoffs, Dennis Franz, and Oscar Brown Jr.

The budget for the film was under $380,000, and when it was finalized Twentieth Century-Fox screened it. They turned it down, thinking "it was too arty for kids and too black for suburban art-houses". This led World Northal to choose it for distribution and placed it in art-houses and urban cinemas that summer. Davis recovered two-thirds of the budget and started to be sought after by film studios for urban films.

== Reception ==
Film critic Roger Ebert praised Stony Island as an energetic and charming tribute to Chicago's city spirit and music culture. Ebert highlighted the film's semi-documentary feel, driven by performances from the Stony Island Band, which was formed specifically for the movie.

In a retrospective on the film, Noel Murray of The A.V. Club highlighted Stony Island's great sense of late-’70s Chicago and said its focus on setting over the plot made the film a pleasure to watch.

Charles Champlin’s of the Los Angeles Times enjoyed the film's musical energy but criticized its loose, improvisational structure and ultimately found the film uneven.

Bruce McCabe of The Boston Globe called Stony Island an "energetic, bittersweet film" and praised the portrayal of Chicago. McCabe commended the film’s exploration of integration, with black and white musicians succeeding together. Though he did note minor missteps in the script, he also said the performances carried the film.

Joseph Bansoua's review of Stony Island in The Daily Breeze highlights the film's vibrant music and authentic performances. He praises the film's ability to capture the energy of Chicago’s music scene, particularly through its engaging soundtrack of R&B, jazz, and gospel. The actors, many of whom are actual musicians, bring a naturalistic feel to the story, though Bansoua finds some of the characters underdeveloped. He commends the film’s grounded acting, dynamic cinematography by Tak Fujimoto, and its impressive execution on a modest budget, ultimately recognizing Stony Island as an enjoyable and credible indie effort.

Ray Pride of New City Film highlights Stony Island as a grounded and soulful debut from Chicago-bred director Andrew Davis, capturing the city’s South Side and downtown streets with authenticity and spatial precision. Pride praises the film's intimate portrayal of Chicago’s neighborhoods and its moment in time, noting its connection to the city’s history, and the film’s enduring legacy is marked by its vivid sense of place and cultural resonance.

For its April 24, 2012, home-media release, Lee Bay of WBEZ noted that it was the only film role Robinson ever featured in as he died shortly after filming and called him a "charismatic main character" and "an electrifying singer".

== Home media ==
The film was released on DVD in 2012.
