= Holes (film) =

2003 film by Andrew Davis

- Theatrical release poster
- Directed by: Andrew Davis
- Screenplay by: Louis Sachar
- Based on: Holes by Louis Sachar
- Produced by: Andrew Davis; Lowell D. Blank; Mike Medavoy; Teresa Tucker-Davies
- Starring: Sigourney Weaver; Jon Voight; Patricia Arquette; Tim Blake Nelson; Shia LaBeouf
- Cinematography: Stephen St. John
- Edited by: Thomas J. Nordberg; Jeffrey Wolf
- Music by: Joel McNeely
- Production companies: Walt Disney Pictures; Walden Media; Phoenix Pictures; Chicago Pacific Entertainment
- Distributed by: Buena Vista Pictures Distribution
- Release date: April 18, 2003 (United States)
- Running time: 117 minutes
- Country: United States
- Language: English
- Budget: $20 million
- Box office: $71.4 million

Holes is a 2003 American prison adventure film directed by Andrew Davis and written by Louis Sachar, based on his 1998 novel. The film stars Sigourney Weaver, Jon Voight, Patricia Arquette, Tim Blake Nelson, and Shia LaBeouf in his theatrical film debut. In the film, Stanley Yelnats IV (LaBeouf) is sent to Camp Green Lake, a juvenile detention camp in Texas, after being wrongfully convicted of theft. The camp forces inmates to dig holes in a dried lake bed under the command of the cruel Warden Walker (Weaver), who is secretly searching for the buried treasure of outlaw Katherine "Kissin' Kate" Barlow (Arquette).

Director Andrew Davis worked on Holes to showcase his versatility beyond action films, enlisting author Louis Sachar to adapt his novel into a screenplay. Filming took place over ten weeks in California during the summer of 2002 on a $20 million budget. Shia LaBeouf was cast as Stanley after Davis sought a "young Tom Hanks", though the character's weight loss arc from the book was omitted for practicality. Scenes of hole-digging were carefully staged with different depth levels, and bearded dragons portrayed the venomous yellow-spotted lizards. The film, dedicated to actor Scott Plank, who died after filming wrapped, was produced by Chicago Pacific Entertainment and Phoenix Pictures, with distribution by Walt Disney Pictures and Buena Vista.

Holes was released in the United States on April 18, 2003 and grossed $71 million worldwide. The film received generally positive reviews from critics, who praised it for its intelligence and depth. The film won and was nominated for several awards, most notably LaBeouf received a nomination for Breakthrough Performance at the MTV Movie Awards, while the film earned nominations for Best Family Film at the Critics' Choice Awards and Young Artist Awards.

== Plot ==
The Yelnats family has been cursed with bad luck, which they blame on their ancestor Elya's failure to keep a promise to fortune teller Madame Zeroni over a century earlier in Latvia. Stanley Yelnats IV is wrongfully convicted of stealing a pair of sneakers donated to charity by baseball player Clyde "Sweet Feet" Livingston, and is sentenced to 18 months of hard labor at Camp Green Lake, a juvenile detention camp in Texas, in lieu of jail time.

The camp is in a dry lake bed where rain never falls and venomous yellow-spotted lizards thrive. Stanley meets warden Louise Walker, her assistant Mr. Sir, and counselor Dr. Steve Pendanski. Inmates, nicknamed Zero, Zig-Zag, Armpit, Squid, X-Ray, and Magnet, dig holes daily, earning a day off for any finds that intrigue Louise. After Stanley discovers a golden lipstick tube marked K.B. and a fossil, he is accepted into the group and nicknamed Caveman. When Magnet steals Mr. Sir's sunflower seeds, Stanley assumes responsibility and is taken to Walker's cabin. He finds wanted posters there and learns "KB" stands for Katherine "Kissin' Kate" Barlow, a schoolteacher-turned-outlaw who stole a money chest from his great-grandfather Stanley Yelnats Sr.

Camp Green Lake's history is revealed in flashbacks as a flourishing lakeside community in the 19th century. Kate romantically bonds with Sam, an African-American onion merchant who helps repair her schoolhouse. When the wealthy Charles "Trout" Walker discovers the two kissing, he informs the other citizens out of jealousy, who then burn down the schoolhouse and kill Sam. After this murder, rain stops falling on Green Lake. In retaliation, Kate becomes an outlaw, hunting down Trout's men and earning her nickname by kissing the men she murders. As her legend grows, Green Lake declines due to its gradual evaporation. Years later, Kate is found by the now-destitute Walkers. Before allowing herself to be lethally bitten by a lizard, she boasts neither Trout nor his descendants will ever find her buried fortune.

Stanley befriends Zero, who reveals that his real name is Hector Zeroni. One day, Dr. Pendanski mocks Zero, leading Zero to injure him and flee. After some deliberation, Stanley also runs away and searches for Zero, finding him using Sam's rowboat as shelter. Eventually, Stanley carries the ailing Zero up a nearby mountain, and they regain their strength after finding a field of wild onions and a water source. By doing this, Stanley unknowingly fulfills Elya's promise to Madame Zeroni and breaks his family's curse. Zero tells Stanley he took Sweet Feet's sneakers from an auction at a homeless shelter, mistakenly thinking they were a free donation. Zero threw them over the bridge while evading the police, which led to the shoes inadvertently hitting Stanley's head.

Returning to the camp, Stanley and Zero investigate the hole where Stanley found the lipstick and uncover a chest before they are discovered by Louise, Mr. Sir, and Dr. Pendanski. Louise, Trout's granddaughter, admits that she has been using the inmates to search for Kate's treasure. The adults cannot steal the chest from the boys, as the hole is swarming with lizards, which do not bite Stanley and Hector due to the onions they ate earlier. The puzzled adults wait for the lizards to kill the boys. The next morning, the attorney general and Stanley's lawyer arrive, accompanied by Texas Rangers. The chest the boys found is discovered to have belonged to Stanley's great-grandfather. Louise, Mr. Sir (who is actually paroled criminal Marion Sevillo), and Dr. Pendanski (who was impersonating a doctor), are arrested. Stanley and Zero are released, and it rains in Green Lake for the first time in over a century.

The Yelnats family opens the chest, revealing jewels, deeds, and promissory notes, worth millions in the present. They share this with Zero, who uses it to hire private investigators to find his missing mother. Both families live a life of financial ease as neighbors.

== Cast ==
=== Camp Green Lake ===
- Sigourney Weaver as Warden Louise Walker
  - Haleigh Ann Trickett as Young Louise
- Jon Voight as Marion "Mr. Sir" Sevillo
- Tim Blake Nelson as Dr. Steve Pendanski
- Shia LaBeouf as Stanley "Caveman" Yelnats IV
- Khleo Thomas as Hector "Zero" Zeroni
- Brenden Jefferson as Rex "X-Ray" Washburn
- Jake M. Smith as Squid (Alan)
- Byron Cotton as Theodore Thomas "Armpit" Johnson
- Miguel Castro as Magnet (José)
- Max Kasch as Zig-Zag (Ricky)
- Noah Poletiek as Twitch (Brian)
- Roma Maffia as Attorney Carla Morengo
- Zane Holtz as Barf Bag (Lewis)
- Steve Koslowski as Lump

=== Yelnats' Home ===
- Henry Winkler as Stanley Yelnats III, Stanley's father.
- Siobhan Fallon Hogan as Tiffany Yelnats, Stanley's mother.
- Nathan Davis as Stanley Yelnats Jr., Stanley's grandfather.
- Rick Fox as Clyde "Sweet Feet" Livingston
- Nicole Pulliam as Mrs. Livingston, Sweet Feet's wife.
- Shelley Malil as the Yelnats family's landlord
- Michael Cavanaugh as Judge Austin Gorg
- Shirley Butler as Mrs. Zeroni, Zero's mother.

=== Latvia ===
- Eartha Kitt as Madame Zeroni, Zero's great-great-great-grandmother.
- Damien Luvara as Elya Yelnats, Stanley's great-great-grandfather.
- Sanya Mateyas as Myra Menke, Elya's love interest.
- Ravil Isyanov as Morris Menke, Myra's father.
- Ken Davitian as Igor Barkov, Elya's rival.

=== Old Green Lake ===
- Patricia Arquette as Miss Katherine / Kissin' Kate Barlow
- Dulé Hill as Sam the Onion Man, Katherine's love interest.
- Scott Plank as Charles "Trout" Walker, Louise's grandfather.
- Allan Kolman as Stanley Yelnats Sr., Stanley's great-grandfather.
- Louis Sachar as Mr. Collingwood
- Brooke Eby as School Kid

== Production ==
Director Andrew Davis chose to direct Holes to show he was capable of making more than action films such as The Fugitive and Collateral Damage. He encouraged author Louis Sachar to participate in the production and adapt the novel into a screenplay. To break down the novel's action into a film, Davis and Sachar storyboarded over 100 scenes on 3-by-5 note cards, each of which had specific time allotments. Sachar said Davis "went through and said, 'Now as you rewrite it, this card should take half a minute, this one should take three minutes, this one should take one minute, and so on.'" Before Sachar was hired, Richard Kelly was given the job to write the screenplay. His draft diverged from the source material, and had a darker, post-apocalyptic take with sci-fi elements. Kelly stated he was naive and was told by the production staff that he was "insane" before being removed from the film.

Holes was filmed in California over 10 weeks in the summer of 2002 on a $20 million budget. When looking for a child actor to play Stanley, Davis asked for an actor like "a young Tom Hanks". In the original book, Stanley is depicted as obese, shedding considerable weight as the book progresses. The filmmakers chose to drop this aspect from the movie, as they believed it would have been difficult to convincingly portray the weight loss in a live-action film. Initially, Frankie Muniz was cast as Stanley but ultimately dropped out to star in Agent Cody Banks.

The film was shot in several locations, including Ridgecrest, California. LaBeouf was simultaneously doing work for the Disney Channel show Even Stevens, and worked on the film after taping Even Stevens. To show the seven kids' holes being dug gradually throughout the day, different "phases" were used, for each of which the seven holes were given different levels of depth. For the yellow spotted lizards, fourteen bearded dragons were used, four of which were used for the main parts, and the rest used as "background atmosphere lizards". LaBeouf revealed that filming was intense. Due to the constant heat, the cast was only allowed to remain in the holes for about five minutes at a time and would be pulled out, even while they were in the middle of a take. He, the cast, and LaBeouf's father were also uncomfortable with Jon Voight who would remain in character between takes. LaBeouf also shared a half trailer with co-star Jake M. Smith. During one intensely hot day, Smith's entire half of the trailer blew up due to his refrigerator overheating.

The film is dedicated to Scott Plank, who appears in the film and died six months before its release.

The film was produced by Chicago Pacific Entertainment in association with Phoenix Pictures, presented by Walden Media and Walt Disney Pictures, and distributed in many markets by Buena Vista Pictures. Summit Entertainment picked up foreign sales in February 2002 under an agreement with Walden Media. In October 2002, Walden entered into a two-year first look agreement with Disney which would allow them to acquire distribution rights to the film in territories where the film was not previously acquired by a third-party distributor through Walden or Summit.

== Music ==
The film's music includes a new recording of the Grammy-winning "Just Like You" by Keb Mo', and the song "Dig It," which was performed and co-written by The D Tent Boys (the actors portraying the D Tent group inmates), with additional writing by Mickey Petralia, Michael Fitzpatrick, and Doug E. Fresh. The song also included a video that played regularly on the Disney Channel. The soundtrack includes contributions by the Eels, Devin Thompson, Dr. John, Eagle Eye Cherry, Fiction Plane, Little Axe, Moby, North Mississippi Allstars, Pepe Deluxé, Shaggy, Stephanie Bentley, and Teresa James & the Rhythm Tramps. The score was composed and conducted by Joel McNeely.

Holes (Original Soundtrack)

Soundtrack album by Various
- Released: April 15, 2003
- Label: Walt Disney Records

1. "Dig It" – D-Tent Boys
2. "Keep'n It Real" – Shaggy
3. "Mighty Fine Blues" – Eels
4. "Honey" – Moby
5. "I'm Gonna Be A Wheel Someday" – Teresa James & the Rhythm Tramps
6. "Just Like You" – Keb' Mo'
7. "Everybody Pass Me By" – Pepe Deluxé
8. "I Will Survive" – Stephanie Bentley
9. "Shake 'Em On Down" – North Mississippi Allstars
10. "Don't Give Up" – Eagle Eye Cherry
11. "Happy Dayz" – Devin Thompson
12. "Let's Make A Better World" – Dr. John
13. "If Only" – Fiction Plane
14. "Eyes Down" – Eels
15. "Down To The Valley" – Little Axe

== Release ==
=== Home media ===
Holes was released on DVD and VHS on September 23, 2003. The DVD version of the film consists of widescreen and fullscreen versions, being a THX certified release.

The film was released onto Disney+ on April 18, 2020.

== Reception ==
=== Box office ===
Holes grossed $16.3 million in its opening weekend, finishing #2 at the box office behind Anger Management's second weekend. It went on to gross a domestic total of $67.4 million and an additional $4 million in international revenue, totaling $71.4 million at the box office, against a $20 million budget, making the film a moderate financial success. The film was released in the United Kingdom on October 24, 2003, and opened at #9.

As of December 2003, the film sold 3.11 million copies for home use (VHS and DVD) earning a revenue of over $56.2 million.

=== Critical response ===
On the review aggregator website Rotten Tomatoes, the film holds an approval rating of 78% based on 134 reviews. The site's critical consensus reads: "Faithful to its literary source, this is imaginative, intelligent family entertainment." On Metacritic, which uses an average of critics' reviews, the film has a 71 out of 100 rating, based on 28 critics, indicating "generally favorable" reviews. Audiences polled by CinemaScore gave the film an average grade of "A" on an A+ to F scale.

Roger Ebert of the Chicago Sun-Times rated the film three and a half stars of four stars and wrote, "Davis has always been a director with a strong visual sense, and the look of Holes has a noble, dusty loneliness. We feel we are actually in a limitless desert. The cinematographer, Stephen St. John, thinks big and frames his shots for an epic feel that adds weight to the story. I walked in expecting a movie for thirteen somethings, and walked out feeling challenged and satisfied. Curious, how much more grown up and sophisticated Holes is than Anger Management".

Joe Baltake of The Sacramento Bee gave Holes four out of four stars, praising the performances of Shia LaBeouf and Khleo Thomas and the film's emphasis on storytelling over the use of special effects.

Grant Tracey's review in The Waterloo-Cedar Falls Courier described Holes as a complex and thought-provoking film. He praised its exploration of social issues like institutional abuse, racism, and patriarchal injustice while remaining entertaining.

Nancy Churnin of The Dallas Morning News praised Holes as a rare children’s film with real depth, tackling themes of hope and redemption against a backdrop of historical and personal injustices. She also praised Louis Sachar's screenplay and Andrew Davis's direction. Churnin felt the actors' performances, particularly from Shia LaBeouf and Khleo Thomas, helped the realism in heartfelt connections. She later thought the film's themes resonated between adults and children alike.

Kenneth Turan of The Los Angeles Times gave it three and a half stars out of five, praising its ability to entertain both young and older audiences without condescension. He highlights the film's skillful balance of comedy and menace, crediting Louis Sachar's screenplay for preserving the novel's rich themes and intricate storytelling, although some changes from the book—like expanding Stanley's family for comic relief—feel unnecessary. The film's casting, particularly its naturalistic young actors, adds authenticity, while the adult performances, especially Jon Voight's, bring a touch of exaggerated humor.

Joanna Connors, in her review for The Plain Dealer, gave Holes an A, praising it as a rare film that treats its young audience with intelligence and respect. She commended director Andrew Davis for staying true to Louis Sachar’s novel, allowing its blend of humor, folklore, and realism to shine without condescension. The film's technical polish and strong performances, particularly from Shia LaBeouf, Khleo Thomas, and Jon Voight helped elevate it above most adult-oriented films. Connors highlighted the dedication of the cast and crew, noting that their effort in the harsh Death Valley conditions contributed to something truly special.

Jim Lane's review in Sacramento News & Review awarded Holes four out of five stars, acknowledging it as an ambitious adaptation of Louis Sachar's novel, juggling multiple storylines with a complexity that occasionally challenges director Andrew Davis. Although Lane was critical of the film's transitions, he felt they were "engaging". Lane would later go on to praise Sachar, Davis, and the cast for making the film's mix of tones and storytelling elements come together successfully.

=== Awards ===
Year	Award	Category	Nominee	Result
2002	California On Location Awards	Production Company of the Year – Features	Green Lake Productions	Won
2003	California on Location Awards	Location Professional of the Year – Features	Mark Benton Johnson (Shared with S.W.A.T.)	Won
2003	Artios Awards	Best Casting for Feature Film, Comedy	Amanda Mackey Johnson and Cathy Sandrich	Nominated
2004	Critics' Choice Awards	Best Family Film – Live Action		Nominated
2004	Las Vegas Film Critics Society Awards	Best Family Film		Won
2004	MTV Movie Awards	Breakthrough Performance	Shia LaBeouf	Nominated
2004	Phoenix Film Critics Society Awards	Best Live Action Family Film and Best Performance by a Youth in a Lead or Supporting Role – Male	Shia LaBeouf	Nominated
2004	Young Artist Awards	Best Family Feature Film – Drama		Nominated
2004	Young Artist Awards	Best Performance in a Feature Film – Leading Young Actor	Shia LaBeouf	Nominated
2004	Young Artist Awards	Best Performance in a Feature Film – Supporting Young Actor	Noah Poletiek	Nominated
2004	Young Artist Awards	Best Performance in a Feature Film – Supporting Young Actor	Khleo Thomas	Nominated

== Cancelled reboot ==
In 2025, a gender-swapped television series reboot was revealed to be in development at Disney+ with a pilot episode ordered. The produced pilot episode was written by Alina Mankin and directed by Jac Schaeffer with Shay Rudolph, Greg Kinnear, and Aidy Bryant starring. However, it ultimately didn't lead to a series order and was eventually cancelled.
