= Christmas Song (album) =

Studio album by Mannheim Steamroller
- Released: October 9, 2007
- Recorded: 2007
- Genre: Christmas, symphonic pop
- Length: 42:28
- Label: American Gramaphone
- Producer: Chip Davis

Mannheim Steamroller chronology
Romantic Themes (2005)	Christmas Song (2007)	Christmasville (2008)

Mannheim Steamroller Christmas albums chronology
Christmas Celebration (2004)	Christmas Song (2007)	Christmasville (2008)

Professional ratings
Review scores
Source	Rating
Allmusic	(?)

Christmas Song is Mannheim Steamroller's fifth Christmas studio album and eighth overall. It was released in 2007 on CD by American Gramaphone, and features twelve Christmas songs. Steamroller co-founder Jackson Berkey does not appear on the album.

== Track listing ==
No.	Title	Writer(s)	Length
1.	"Let It Snow, Let It Snow, Let It Snow"	Sammy Cahn, Jule Styne	3:42
2.	"The Christmas Song" (vocal by Johnny Mathis)	Mel Tormé, Robert Wells	3:21
3.	"Santa Claus is Comin' to Town"	Fred Coots, Haven Gillespie	2:54
4.	"It Came Upon the Midnight Clear"	Edmund Sears, Richard Storrs Willis	2:45
5.	"Feliz Navidad"	José Feliciano	3:51
6.	"Catching Snowflakes on Your Tongue"	Chip Davis	4:09
7.	"Masters in This Hall"	William Morris, Willis	2:45
8.	"Above The Northern Lights" (vocal by Gene Nery)	Davis, Ed Wilson	4:33
9.	"Frosty the Snowman"	Steve Nelson, Walter E. Rollins	4:24
10.	"Traditions of Christmas" (music box version)	Davis	0:36
11.	"Christmas Lullaby" (vocal by Olivia Newton-John)	Davis, Wilson	3:59
12.	"Have Yourself A Merry Little Christmas"	Ralph Blane, Hugh Martin	5:29
Total length:			42:28

== Personnel ==
- Chip Davis – Recorders, drums
- Tom Hartig – Alto saxophone
- Bobby Jenkins – Oboe
- Johnny Mathis – Solo vocal
- Gene Nery – Solo vocal
- Olivia Newton-John – Solo vocal
- Arnie Roth – Concert master, viel
- Glen Smith – 12-string guitar
- Paul Winter – Soprano saxophone
