= Chain Reaction (1996 film) =

1996 film by Andrew Davis

- Theatrical release poster
- Directed by: Andrew Davis
- Screenplay by: J. F. Lawton; Michael Bortman
- Story by: Arne L. Schmidt; Rick Seaman; Josh Friedman
- Produced by: Arne L. Schmidt; Andrew Davis
- Starring: Keanu Reeves; Morgan Freeman; Rachel Weisz; Fred Ward; Kevin Dunn; Brian Cox
- Cinematography: Frank Tidy
- Edited by: Don Brochu; Dov Hoenig; Mark Stevens; Arthur Schmidt
- Music by: Jerry Goldsmith
- Production companies: The Zanuck Company; Chicago Pacific Entertainment
- Distributed by: 20th Century Fox
- Release date: August 2, 1996
- Running time: 107 minutes
- Country: United States
- Language: English
- Budget: $50 million
- Box office: $60.2 million

Chain Reaction is a 1996 American science fiction action thriller film directed by Andrew Davis and starring Keanu Reeves, Morgan Freeman, Rachel Weisz, Fred Ward, Kevin Dunn and Brian Cox. The plot centers on the invention of a new non-contaminating power source based on hydrogen and the attempts by the United States Government to prevent the spreading of this technology to other countries. The film was released in the United States on August 2, 1996.

== Plot ==
While working with a team from the University of Chicago on a project to convert hydrogen from water into clean energy, student machinist Eddie Kasalivich inadvertently discovers a sound frequency in his home laboratory that perfectly stabilizes their process the next day. As the team celebrates with a party at the project laboratory, Dr. Paul Shannon, the leader of the project, and Dr. Alistair Barkley, the project manager, debate whether or not to share the scientific discovery. Later that night, project physicist Dr. Lily Sinclair finds her car unable to start, so Eddie gets her home by bus. Back in the laboratory, Alistair and assistant Dr. Lu Chen prepare to upload their discovery to the Internet to share the breakthrough with the world, while a van approaches the premises. Chen hears a noise and goes outside to investigate, but is kidnapped by unknown assailants as Alistair is also attacked.

Once he has dropped Lily off at Alistair's house, where she lives on the third floor, Eddie returns to the laboratory to retrieve his motorcycle but notices a suspicious van departing. Hearing alarms, he runs inside to find Alistair dead with a plastic bag over his head and Chen missing. As the hydrogen reactor has become dangerously unstable, Eddie, unable to deactivate it, speeds away as a concealed detonator triggers a massive hydrogen explosion that destroys the laboratory and eight blocks' worth of surrounding streets.

Upon returning from questioning by the FBI, Eddie and Lily realize that they are being framed after encountering planted evidence in both of their houses. The two flee to an observatory in Wisconsin belonging to Maggie McDermott, an old friend of Eddie's. After resting up, they contact Paul but are almost caught and narrowly escape. As the pair are evading more police, Paul meets with Lyman Earl Collier at the C-Systems Research complex, where it is revealed that C-Systems orchestrated the plot to destroy the laboratory and frame the pair for it, with Lyman ordering the attack. Despite some disagreement, Paul and Lyman decide to continue hunting for the pair, a task facilitated when Eddie covertly arranges a meeting with Paul. At their rendezvous, Paul reveals his involvement in framing Eddie, but the meeting ends in an ambush in which Lyman's thugs Yusef Reed and Clancy Butler, who murdered Alistair, capture Lily while Eddie barely escapes.

After tracing the license plate on the thugs' van, Eddie tracks them to the secret C-Systems Research facility where Paul and Lyman are forcing Lily and Chen to replicate the project. When C-Systems' test reactor malfunctions, Paul, the scientists and the prisoners all depart, allowing Eddie to furtively "fix" the system that night. The next morning, one of the other scientists discovers the working reactor and everyone celebrates. A suspicious Paul immediately obtains a download of the fusion data, and secretly gives it to his assistant, Anita, for safekeeping. He then encounters Eddie at a computer in the company boardroom, who demands his release for making the reactor work. Paul agrees but Lyman refuses, so Eddie sets the reactor to explode while sending proof of his innocence to the FBI and blueprints of the reactor to "hopefully a couple thousand" international scientists. Lyman responds by shooting Chen dead, then locking in Eddie and Lily to die in the explosion as he, Paul, and their staff flee the site.

Lyman is given a falsified copy of the fusion data before Paul kills him for overstepping the bounds of the program, leaving his body in an elevator. During his own escape, he deactivates the containment system, allowing Eddie and Lily to escape. They are attacked by Reed and Butler over an ascending construction lift but escape by climbing aboard it moments before a blast wave sweeps through the complex, incinerating the corpses of Reed, Butler, and Lyman. Having survived the shockwave, Eddie and Lily are met by FBI agents Ford and Doyle, now convinced of their innocence, who take them to safety. Paul is shown dictating a memo to Anita in a chauffeured limo, informing the Director of the CIA that "...C-System [is] no longer a viable entity."

In a post-credits scene, the C-Systems facility is seen imploding into the landscape.

== Cast ==
- Keanu Reeves as Eddie Kasalivich, a machinist working on a team from the University of Chicago; he is forced to go on the run with Dr. Lily Sinclair when someone frames him for the murder of his boss, Dr. Alistair Barkley, and the destruction of his laboratory, and both must work to clear their names before they are captured or killed
- Morgan Freeman as Paul Shannon, the enigmatic leader of the project at the University of Chicago; his motives are unclear throughout the movie, but he advises Eddie to turn himself into the authorities. It is later disclosed that he is the head of the entire program that includes Lyman, who tries to kill the research team. A scene with Agents Ford and Doyle and the ending suggests Shannon is with the CIA.
- Rachel Weisz as Dr. Lily Sinclair, a physicist working with Dr. Alistair Barkley who goes on the run with Eddie when they are framed for Alistair's murder and the destruction of his laboratory
- Fred Ward as FBI Agent Leon Ford, who leads the investigation to discover the cause of the destruction of the laboratory; initially focusing on Eddie and Lily, he soon suspects the involvement of government organizations
- Kevin Dunn as FBI Agent Doyle, Ford's assistant in the investigation who helps Ford track down Eddie, Lily, and later, C-Systems
- Brian Cox as Lyman Earl Collier, Chairman of C-Systems Research who is behind the conspiracy to keep the hydrogen power plant a secret
- Joanna Cassidy as Maggie McDermott, an old friend of Eddie's who lives in an observatory in Wisconsin, where Eddie and Lily escape to after a warrant is issued for their arrest
- Chelcie Ross as FBI Agent Ed Rafferty
- Nicholas Rudall as Dr. Alistair Barkley, head of the project to develop energy from the water who is later suffocated
- Tzi Ma as Lu Chen, Project Manager on the Hydrogen Project and Dr. Barkley's right-hand man; when Barkley is killed, Dr. Chen is kidnapped and forced to work at C-Systems
- Krzysztof Pieczyński as Lucasz Screbneski, the scientist on the original project who is secretly working for C-Systems
- Eddie Bo Smith Jr. and Danny Goldring as Yusef Reed and Clancy Butler, Collier's right hand men for C-Systems
- Margaret Travolta as Anita Fermi, Shannon's personal assistant.

In addition, Michael Shannon and Neil Flynn make appearances as a van driver and a Wisconsin State Police Trooper, respectively.

== Production ==
In January 1995, it was reported that 20th Century Fox had secured deals with Keanu Reeves and Andrew Davis to star in and direct respectively the action thriller Dead Drop. Reeves was reportedly paid $7 million upfront against at least 5% of first-dollar gross for his role while Davis was reportedly paid $5 million.

Large portions of the film were shot on location in and around Chicago, Illinois, including the University of Chicago, Argonne National Laboratory, the Museum of Science and Industry, the Field Museum of Natural History, Michigan Avenue, and the James R. Thompson Center (Atrium Mall). Additional scenes were shot at Yerkes Observatory in Williams Bay, Wisconsin, on Geneva Lake in southern Wisconsin, interiors of the U.S. Capitol were shot at the Wisconsin State Capitol, in Madison, Wisconsin, at Inland Steel Company (now known as Cleveland-Cliffs Inc.) in East Chicago, Indiana, and at a private residence in Barrington Hills, Illinois. Because of the cold Great Lakes winter and filming taking place during record-breaking winter weather, unique challenges were present for the cast and crew. Morgan Freeman noted "It was difficult for everyone, particularly for me because I'm tropical," he said. "I don't do cold weather. This is Chicago...in the winter. I was ill and in bed [for] four days at a crack. It was really rough."

== Reception ==
Chain Reaction received negative reviews. The film holds an 18% rating on Rotten Tomatoes based on 33 reviews, with the site's critical consensus stating, "Ironic given the scientific breakthrough at the story's core, Chain Reaction is a man-on-the-run thriller that mostly sticks to [the] generic formula." Audiences polled by CinemaScore gave the film an average grade of "C+" on an A+ to F scale.

Roger Ebert gave the film two and a half stars out of four, writing: "By movie's end, I'd seen some swell photography and witnessed some thrilling chase scenes, but when it came to understanding the movie, I didn't have a clue." Jeff Millar of the Houston Chronicle wrote: "The narrative is very complex, but what's on the screen is little more than generic, non-narrative-specific, guy-being-chased stuff". Conversely, Edward Guthmann of the San Francisco Chronicle felt the film was one of the summer's best movies, writing: "[Chain Reaction] has better acting, better writing, more spectacular chase sequences and more genuine drama than all of this summer's blockbusters."

Chain Reaction and its cast were nominated for one award, with Keanu Reeves being nominated for the Razzie for Worst Actor, which was won by both Tom Arnold and Pauly Shore.

Chain Reaction debuted in fourth place at the box office behind A Time to Kill, Independence Day and Matilda, collecting a total of $7.5 million during its opening weekend. The film grossed just over USD$60.2 million worldwide.

Reeves has since expressed regret about Chain Reaction, blaming script changes. Of his character, he said: "Originally, I was married. I had this kid and I did this research and I didn't know that what I was researching had this effect. And someone got killed and I had these regrets and I'm trying to stop what I'm doing, but they can't let me so they're chasing me. And then all of a sudden I turn into this 24-year-old machinist and I turned to (director) Andrew Davis and I said, 'What happened to the movie I said yes to? What happened to that script? Where did that go?' And he said, 'No, I got something better,' and so I just had to go with it."

== Scientific accuracy ==
In one interpretation of the film's plot, a scientific process supposedly extracts hydrogen from water, then burns the hydrogen to generate power, and leaves only water as a residue, essentially a chemical perpetual motion. The movie never clarifies how the hydrogen is extracted from the water, nor how water is still left over. The character Dr. Shannon makes contradictory statements in the combination of ideas mashed together: one time he says this is accomplished with a laser with millions of degrees, another time he says frequencies of sound and sonoluminescence. In one scene, the movie shows a bubbling container reminiscent of cold fusion electrolytic cells and another reference sustained fusion. A character in the film claims that a glass of water could power Chicago for weeks, but no clear explanation is ever given as to whether this is by simply burning hydrogen released by highly efficient means or through nuclear processes. The film's title is also misleading, since "chain reaction" is related to nuclear fission, not fusion.

The film is based on the premise that free energy suppression is real. The main character is told that his discovery is too disruptive: energy would suddenly be cheap, oil would no longer be necessary, oil companies would go bankrupt, and such sudden economic changes would throw society into chaos.
