= A Perfect Murder =

1998 American film by Andrew Davis

- Theatrical release poster
- Directed by: Andrew Davis
- Written by: Patrick Smith Kelly
- Based on: Dial M for Murder by Frederick Knott
- Produced by: Arnold Kopelson; Anne Kopelson; Peter MacGregor-Scott; Christopher Mankiewicz
- Starring: Michael Douglas; Gwyneth Paltrow; Viggo Mortensen; David Suchet
- Cinematography: Dariusz Wolski
- Edited by: Dov Hoenig; Dennis Virkler
- Music by: James Newton Howard
- Production company: Kopelson Entertainment
- Distributed by: Warner Bros.
- Release date: June 5, 1998
- Running time: 107 minutes
- Country: United States
- Languages: English; Arabic
- Budget: $60 million
- Box office: $128 million

A Perfect Murder is a 1998 American crime thriller film directed by Andrew Davis and written by Patrick Smith Kelly. It stars Michael Douglas, Gwyneth Paltrow, and Viggo Mortensen. It is a remake of the 1954 film Dial M for Murder.

== Plot ==
Wall Street trader Steven Taylor is married to the much younger and wealthy Emily. Meanwhile, a smitten Emily is having an affair with artist David Shaw, for whom she considers leaving Steven. One day, Steven arrives at David's art studio. Steven not only knows about the affair, but has researched David's past. His real identity is Winston Lagrange, an ex-convict who cons rich women. Pointing out that he can easily return him to prison, Steven recruits David into murdering Emily for $500,000, paying him $100,000 in advance.

Steven takes Emily's housekey and hides it outside the service entrance to their lavish Manhattan co-op apartment. David is to use the key to enter the apartment, kill her, and make it appear as a robbery gone bad. At his weekly card game, Steven takes a break and uses his cellphone to call an automated bank system, confirming his alibi, while using a second phone to call Emily. Emily answers in the kitchen and is attacked by a masked assailant, but she fatally stabs him in the neck with a meat thermometer. Steven returns and finds the assailant's body and a distraught Emily, who has called 911. Working quickly, Steven takes the key from the body, puts it back on Emily's keychain and damages the service entrance door with a screwdriver, then plants it on the assailant. The NYPD arrives, led by Detective Moe Karaman. They remove the assailant's mask, but the body is not David's.

The next day, Steven contacts David, who explains he hired someone he knows from prison to commit the murder, as he did not think he could do it.

Emily notices that the key on her ring does not fit the apartment's lock. Suspicious, she confides to her friend that Steven would have inherited her entire $100 million fortune if she had been killed. She makes discrete inquiries and learns that Steven's extremely risky margin trades on the stock market are unraveling. If he is unable to find enough capital to cover the balance, both Steven's finances and his credit will be completely wiped out. Detective Karaman tells Emily that no housekey was found on the assailant's body.

Soon after, David calls Steven and plays an audio tape of the two discussing the plan to kill Emily. They meet at a local deli, where David demands the full $500,000 or he will turn Steven in.

Emily visits the assailant's apartment to check if the key on her ring fits the lock, which it does. When she confronts Steven, he explains that David is blackmailing them and he has been paying him off to stop seeing Emily. When he saw her dead assailant in their kitchen, he assumed it was David, who had threatened to use violence before, and took the key from his pocket to shield Emily from facing murder charges. Steven insists that they are not to call the police as he has tampered with evidence.

Steven gives David the money, then follows him onto an Amtrak train and kills him, taking the money and David's gun. As he dies, a laughing David reveals he mailed the tape to Emily via courier service. Steven rushes home and finds the mail still unopened. He hides the money, gun, and audio tape in his safe before showering.

Emily asks Steven if they should change the locks, as her key is still missing. Steven retrieves the key from where he hid it and attempts to plant it somewhere else, but Emily sees him. She explains the assailant must have returned the key to the hiding place after opening the door. She reveals she knows everything, having found the tape in the safe and listened to it while he showered. As she turns away, Steven attacks her, vowing she will only leave him dead. After a brief fight, Emily grabs David's gun from the safe and kills Steven. NYPD Detective Karaman later comforts a heartbroken Emily, telling her not to blame herself, as she had no choice but to kill Steven in self-defense.

== Cast ==
- Michael Douglas as Steven Taylor
- Gwyneth Paltrow as Emily Bradford Taylor
- Viggo Mortensen as David Shaw
- David Suchet as Detective Mohamed "Moe" Karaman
- Sarita Choudhury as Raquel Martinez
- Constance Towers as Sandra Bradford
- Novella Nelson as Ambassador Alice Wills
- Michael P. Moran as Bobby Fain
- Gerry Becker as Roger Brill
- Will Lyman as Jason Gates
- David Eigenberg as Stein

== Comparisons to the original film ==
In Hitchcock's Dial M for Murder, the characters played by Ray Milland and Grace Kelly are depicted as living in a modest London flat, although it is implied that they are quite wealthy, as Milland's character, Tony Wendice, is a retired tennis champion. Michael Douglas and Gwyneth Paltrow's characters are also shown as a very wealthy couple. Both Kelly and Paltrow's characters are striking blondes. Both films make use of the mystery of the fact that no key was found on the dead man when he was killed by Kelly and Paltrow's characters, as both their husbands had removed them in an attempt to pin the crime on their wives. Toward the beginning of Dial M for Murder, when Kelly and Robert Cummings are shown together in the Wendice flat, and Milland comes home, Kelly greets him with "There you are!" and kisses him. Presumably in homage to the original film, Douglas's character greets Paltrow exactly the same way when she arrives home to their apartment at the beginning of A Perfect Murder.

Throughout the film, Emily carries an Hermès Kelly bag, named after Grace Kelly who was often photographed carrying the model of purse.

The title A Perfect Murder matches the translation that was made in some countries of Hitchcock's film, known in Italian as Il delitto perfetto and in Spanish as Crimen perfecto; in French it was Le crime était presque parfait.

== Production ==
In June 1997, it was reported that Michael Douglas and director Andrew Davis were in negotiations with Warner Bros. to team on A Perfect Murder, a loose remake of Dial M for Murder for producers Arnold and Anne Kopelson. In August of that year, Gwyneth Paltrow joined the cast opposite Douglas.

Principal photography began on October 14, 1997. Filming took place in & around New York City. The location of Steven & Emily's apartment was filmed at the Convent of the Sacred Heart building in Manhattan. The Bradford Mansion was filmed at the Salutation House in Long Island. Filming ended on January 13, 1998.

== Alternate ending ==
An alternate ending exists and is presented, with optional commentary, on the original Blu-ray disc release. In this version, Steven comes back from finding the key replaced where he had hidden it and Emily confronts him in the kitchen rather than in their foyer. The scene plays out with the same dialogue, but Steven never physically attacks her. He still tells her that the only way she'll leave him is dead, and she shoots him. Steven then says "You won't get away with this" before dying and Emily purposely injures herself, making it look like self-defense.

== Reception ==
=== Box office ===
A Perfect Murder opened in second place at the box office behind The Truman Show, grossing $16,615,704 during its first weekend. It ended with a total worldwide gross of $128,038,368.

=== Critical response ===
A Perfect Murder received mixed reviews. Stephen Holden of The New York Times called it a "skillfully plotted update of Frederick Knott's play". Owen Gleiberman of Entertainment Weekly commented, "I've seen far worse thrillers than A Perfect Murder, but the movie is finally more competent than it is pleasurable. All that lingers from it is the color of money."

Rita Kempley of The Washington Post noted, "The trouble is, we don't really much care about this philandering billionaire glamour puss, who seems perfectly capable of taking care of herself. We don't care about her husband or lover either. The story's most compelling character, an Arab American detective (the superb British actor David Suchet), becomes a minor player here. Nevertheless, like John Williams in the Hitchcock film, Suchet commits the film's only believable crime: He steals the show."

Paul Clinton of CNN observed, "This production is stylishly mounted... Douglas is an excellent actor and a gifted producer. However, he should hang up his spurs when it comes to playing a romantic lead with women in their twenties."

Roger Ebert, who gave the film three stars out of four, wrote "[It] works like a nasty little machine to keep us involved and disturbed; my attention never strayed". Meanwhile, James Berardinelli wrote that the film "has inexplicably managed to eliminate almost everything that was worthwhile about Dial M for Murder, leaving behind the nearly-unwatchable wreckage of a would-be '90s thriller."

A Perfect Murder holds a 55% rating on Rotten Tomatoes from 55 reviews. The site's consensus states: "A slick little thriller that relies a bit too much on surprise events to generate suspense." It has a score of 50/100, based on 22 reviews ("mixed or average" reviews) from Metacritic. Audiences polled by CinemaScore gave the film an average grade of "B" on an A+ to F scale.
