= The Guardian (2006 film) =

2006 film by Andrew Davis

- Theatrical release poster
- Directed by: Andrew Davis
- Written by: Ron L. Brinkerhoff
- Produced by: Beau Flynn; Tripp Vinson
- Starring: Kevin Costner; Ashton Kutcher; Neal McDonough; Melissa Sagemiller; Clancy Brown; Sela Ward
- Cinematography: Stephen St. John
- Edited by: Thomas J. Nordberg; Dennis Virkler
- Music by: Trevor Rabin
- Production companies: Touchstone Pictures; Beacon Pictures; Contrafilm; Firm Films
- Distributed by: Buena Vista Pictures Distribution
- Release date: September 29, 2006
- Running time: 139 minutes
- Country: United States
- Language: English
- Budget: $70 million
- Box office: $95 million

The Guardian is a 2006 American action-adventure drama film directed by Andrew Davis. The film stars Kevin Costner and Ashton Kutcher. The title of the film refers to a legendary figure within the film which protects people lost at sea: "the Guardian". The film focuses on the United States Coast Guard and their Aviation Survival Technician program. The Guardian was released by Buena Vista Pictures Distribution on September 29, 2006. The film received mixed to negative reviews from critics and grossed $95 million against a $70 million budget.

== Plot ==
Senior Chief Petty Officer Ben Randall is the top rescue swimmer at the United States Coast Guard's Aviation Survival Technician (AST) program, but the long hours have destroyed his marriage. When on a rescue, Ben loses his team in a HH-60J Jayhawk helicopter crash at sea. While waiting in a survival raft, his best friend, Chief Petty Officer Carl Billings, dies. Shaken by survivor guilt, Ben is transferred to become an instructor at the Coast Guard AST training school in Louisiana, where he develops a legendary reputation among the students for his high number of rescues. One student is hot-shot candidate Jake Fischer, a top high school competitive swimmer who rejected scholarships to every Ivy League college to enlist in the Coast Guard. During training, Jake meets local school teacher, Emily Thomas, and they begin a casual relationship.

The initial weeks of training end with most of the students dropping out and advanced instruction begins. One day, Jake arrives late, and Ben punishes his entire class for his tardiness. Believing Jake to be lazy and unmotivated, Ben tries to force him to quit, but gradually begins to see Jake's persistence and dedication.

Jake meets Emily in a bar and tells her about beating Ben's old records. The bartender, a friend of Ben's, tells Jake about a time when Ben injured himself saving every victim from a burning hospital ship full of invalid patients.

Later, Jake befriends Billy Hodge, a trainee who flunked the course twice because he is unable to cope with panicked victims in the water. Jake takes him out for a drink at a Navy bar to cheer him up, but they get in a fight with a group of seamen and are arrested, causing Jake to miss a date with Emily. Chief AST Jack Skinner bails the pair out, and Jake takes the blame for the fight. Back on base, Ben and Jake get into a confrontation about their pasts; it is revealed that in high school, Jake survived a car crash that killed the rest of his swim team, which he blames himself for despite having been sober. They bond over their experiences as sole survivors and return to the bar, where Ben defeats a seaman harassing them, forcing the rest to stand down.

At graduation, only a handful of candidates remain. Jake has emerged as a leader during training. Emily attends his graduation, but they end their relationship because Jake is leaving for an assignment at CG Air Station Kodiak, Alaska, Ben's previous post.

Ben and Jake are sent to rescue two kayakers trapped in a cave. Ben experiences flashbacks so Jake must guide him, but the rescue is eventually successful; however, the experience prompts Ben to retire. Before he leaves, Ben tells Jake that the only record he kept track of was the 22 people he lost during his career. Ben visits his wife to apologize and indicate he will not contest the divorce.

Jake is sent to rescue the crew of a sinking fishing trawler, but he becomes trapped in the hold trying to save the captain, who is killed by debris. His helicopter is forced to return to base, where Ben hears of the situation and decides to suit up and rescue Jake personally. He frees Jake, but as they are winched upwards towards the helicopter, their combined weight causes the winch cable to begin separating. Knowing it will break, Ben unclips himself so Jake can survive. Jake catches him, but Ben removes his glove and slips free, plummeting to his death.

Much later, Jake is on a rescue mission, when one of the survivors repeats the legend of the Guardian to him, which he connects to Ben. He then surprises Emily while she is teaching a class, and the two reconnect.

== Cast ==
- Kevin Costner as Ben Randall
- Ashton Kutcher as Jake Fischer
- Neal McDonough as Jack Skinner
- Melissa Sagemiller as Emily Thomas
- Leigh Hennessy as drowning woman
- Clancy Brown as Captain William Hadley
- Brian Geraghty as Billy Hodge
- Sela Ward as Helen Randall
- Omari Hardwick as Chief Petty Officer Carl Billings
- Michael Rady as Zingaro
- Peter Gail as Airman Danny Doran
- Shelby Fenner as Cate Lindsey
- Damon Lipari as Damon Bennett
- Bonnie Bramlett as Maggie McGlone
- John Heard as Captain Frank Larson
- Dulé Hill as Ken Weatherly
- Brian Patrick Wade as Mitch Lyons
- Joe Arquette as Antunez
- Tilky Jones as Tilky Flint
- Chicago Catz as band in bar
- Travis Willingham as Travis Finley

== Production ==
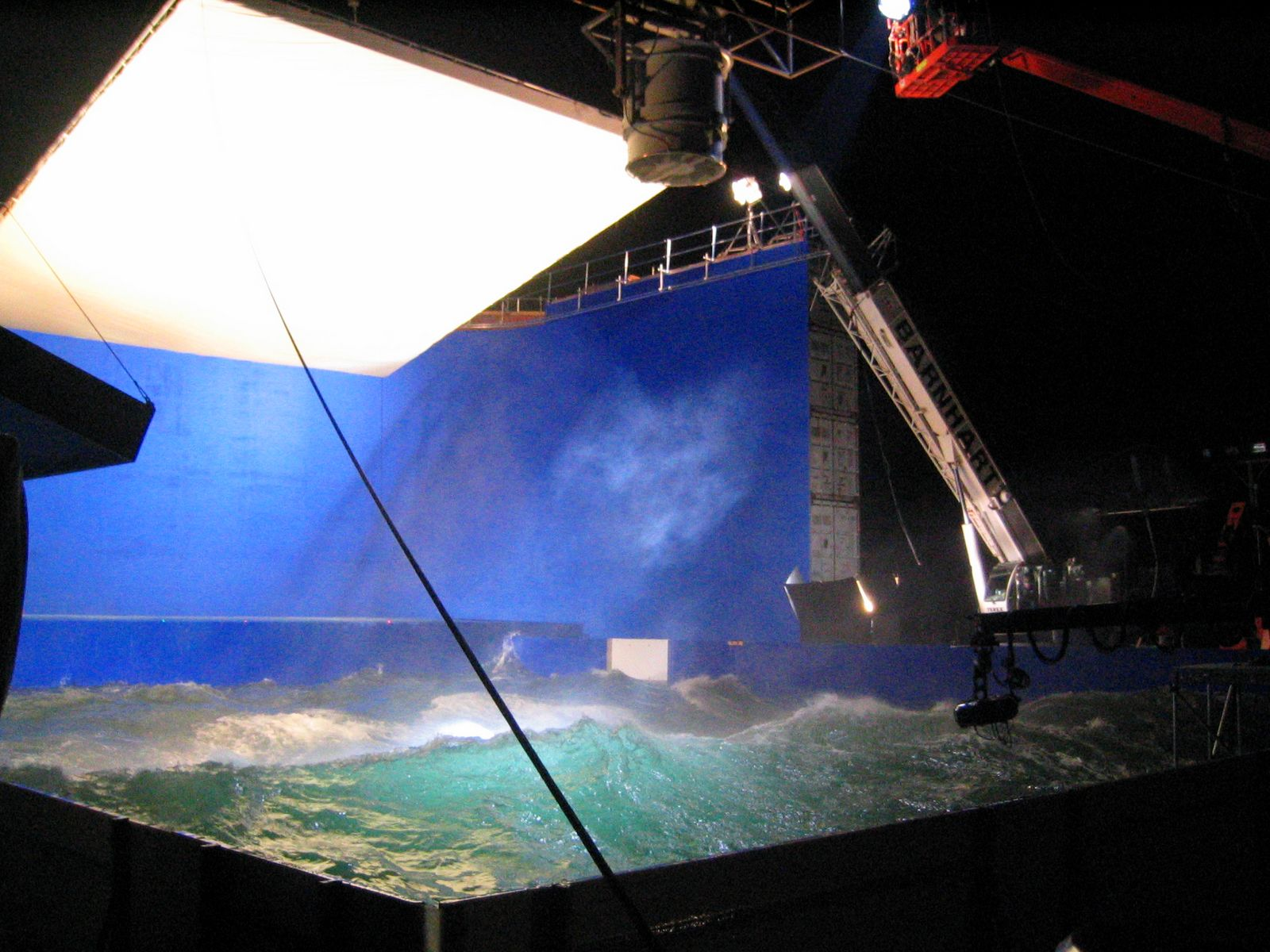
A wave pool used during filming

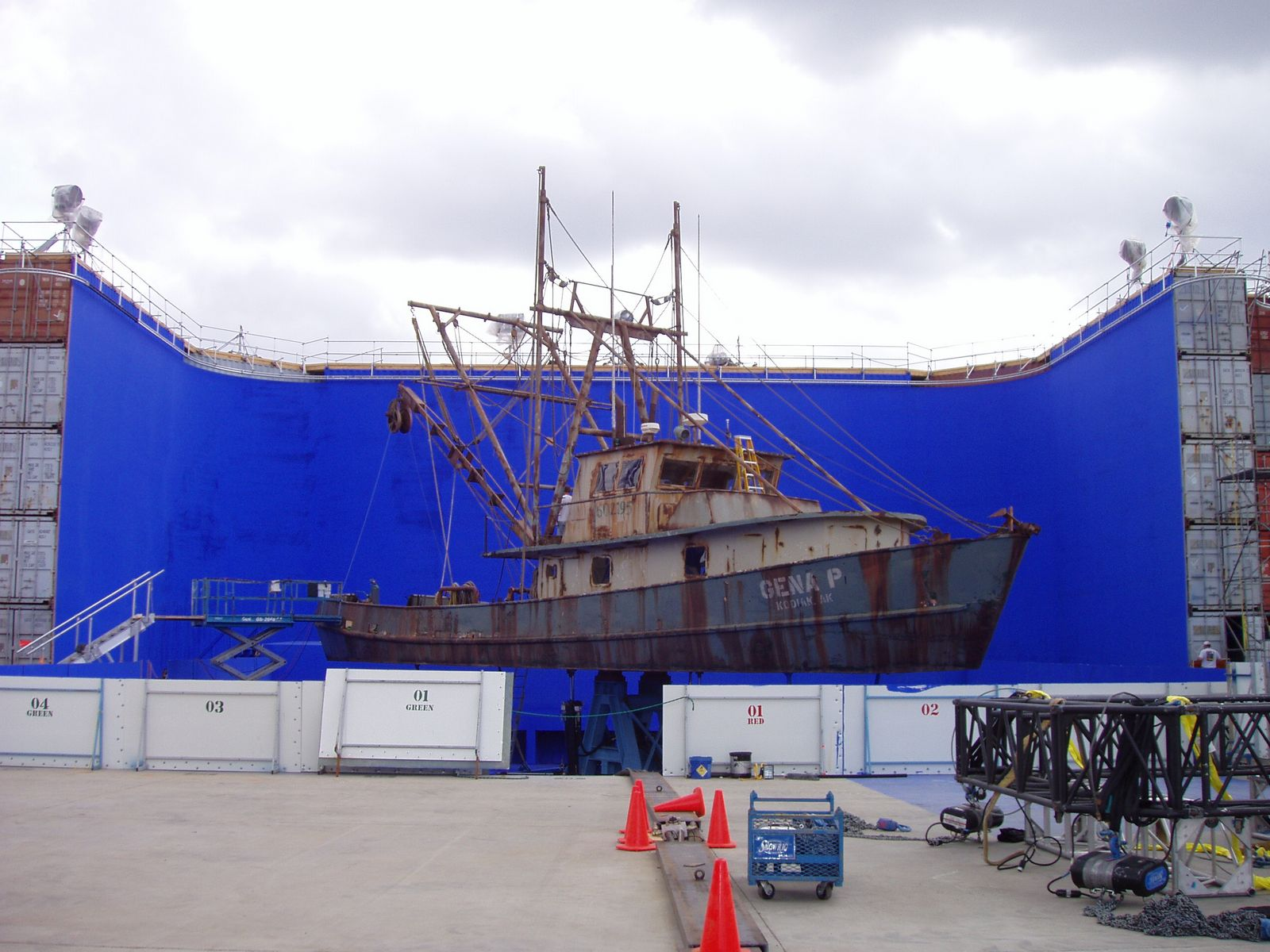
A ship located on a hydraulic gimbal used for filming

David Dobkin was originally slated to direct The Guardian until being replaced by Andrew Davis. Ron Brinkerhoff was also originally involved, making the pitch for a mid-six-figure-budgeted film, before Disney took over the production.

Following the series of hurricanes in the southern United States in 2005, production moved to Shreveport, Louisiana. Some of the base scenes were filmed at Barksdale Air Force Base in Bossier City, Louisiana and at Camp Minden in Minden, Louisiana. Some of the scenes that were supposed to be filmed in Kodiak, Alaska were actually filmed at CG Air Station Elizabeth City, North Carolina. Sixty thousand pounds of ice were needed on the set. The training pool used in the movie was LSU–Shreveport's natatorium. The wave scenes were filmed at Louisiana Wave Studio, Metropolitan Ave, Lynbrook, Shreveport.

The film was revised after Hurricane Katrina, with the addition of several comments on the storm and the rescues. The end credits are replete with "glory" shots of U.S. Coast Guard helicopters conducting rescues in the greater New Orleans area. The DVD contains a special feature on U.S. Coast Guard rescue operations, especially in the aftermath of Katrina.

Many of the supporting actors in The Guardian, including ASTC instructors, helicopter pilots, and support personnel, are actual U.S. Coast Guard rescue swimmers, pilots, and ground personnel. Several characters, including Kutcher's, identify themselves as airmen. An airman is the enlisted rating of a Coast Guardsman who is undesignated and/or currently undergoing training in an aviation related field. Similar ratings within the Coast Guard are those of seaman and fireman.

One of the students was Mark Gangloff, an Olympic swimmer who received a gold medal in the Athens Olympic Games. The production company hired local contractors to build a massive indoor wave pool for production.

== Historical relevance ==
The mishap in The Guardian where Randall loses his crew is loosely based on an actual U.S. Coast Guard aviation mishap in Alaska. The aircraft was an HH-3F Pelican (USCG variant of the Jolly Green Giant) instead of the HH-60J Jayhawk (USCG variant of the Blackhawk/Seahawk) pictured in the movie.

== Soundtrack ==
The Guardian

Soundtrack album by Various artists
- Released: September 12, 2006
- Producer: Various artists

Professional ratings
Review scores
Source	Rating
iTunes	link

The soundtrack of The Guardian was released by Hollywood Records on September 12, 2006. The soundtrack uses a variety of music genres, including R&B, country music, rock, soul and blues.

Track listing

No.	Title	Length
1.	"Never Let Go" (performed by Bryan Adams)	5:05
2.	"Something to Talk About" (performed by Shedaisy)	3:54
3.	"Saturday Night" (performed by Ozomatli)	4:01
4.	"Love & Happiness" (performed by Bonnie Bramlett)	4:32
5.	"The Mockingbird" (performed by Lisa Lavie)	3:07
6.	"Hold Tight" (performed by Tad Robinson)	4:03
7.	"Tri-Me" (performed by Abby Ahmad)	4:33
8.	"Hold On, I'm Coming" (performed by Bonnie Bramlett)	2:57
9.	"Shake Up the World" (performed by Stevie "Funkworm" Butler)	4:09
10.	"Friday Night" (performed by Cheryl Wilson)	3:00
11.	"Run Me in the Dirt (Throwdown)" (performed by Butch Flythe & Joseph "Butch" Flythe)	3:29
12.	"The Guardian Suite" (performed by Trevor Rabin)	7:39
Total length:		50:29

== Reception ==
=== Box office ===
The Guardian earned $18 million on its opening weekend (#2 at the box office behind Open Season, which also starred Ashton Kutcher), and almost $95 million worldwide by January 4, 2007.

=== Critical reception ===
At Rotten Tomatoes, The Guardian received a 37% "Rotten" rating, based on 149 reviews. The site's consensus states: "The Coast Guard gets its chance for a heroic movie tribute, but The Guardian does it no justice, borrowing cliche after cliche from other (and better) military branch movies." While Metacritic rates it a 53/100 based on 29 reviews. Stephen Hunter pans it in The Washington Post, calling it "a good little film" for the first hour then it "begins to overload its frail reed of a structure with giant sloppages of cliches from other movies, some so bad it's almost comical", concluding that the movie "veers off into slobbery touchy-feeliness, and the tone becomes mock-religious, almost liturgical." Wesley Morris of The Boston Globe called it "dutiful but dull." A. O. Scott, in his review for The New York Times, notes that participation by actual members of the Coast Guard "lends an air of authenticity" and concludes "... [i]t's not a great movie, but it's certainly one of the finest Coast Guard pictures you're likely to see anytime soon." In a Variety review, Joe Leydon says the movie is "overlong but [the] involving drama has obvious cross-generational appeal." Ed Blank in the Pittsburgh Tribune-Review gave a mixed review, saying "The Guardian regurgitates formulaic elements in a way that pays off repeatedly and potently."
