= Jean-Luc Montminy =

French Canadian dubbing actor

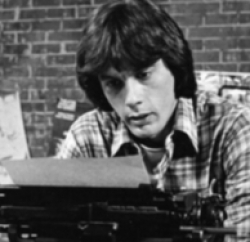

Jean-Luc Montminy is a Quebec actor who specializes in dubbing. He has been the French voice of Bruce Willis, John Travolta, Denzel Washington, Wesley Snipes, Andy Garcia, Colin Firth, William Fichtner, Kurt Russell and many others in the French version of their films in Quebec. He is also the French voice of Voldemort in the Harry Potter saga. His voice can be heard in nearly 1000 films, as an actor in a leading, secondary or other roles.

== Career ==
The official internet site for dubbing in Quebec lists Montminy as having done the voice-over in French for 304 actors featured in leading roles, including, for example, the voice-over for John Travolta in Killing Season—'Face à Face' in French.

Montminy also lent his voice to 613 projects in which he did the voice-over for actors in secondary and other roles as well as animated films. He did the voice-over as Bruce Willis in A Good Day to Die Hard – 'Une belle journée pour crever' in French.

According to the official internet site for dubbing in Quebec, Montminy is the dubbing actor who has most often performed the voice-over for Bruce Willis both in films in which he is a featured actor and in other projects. He is also the actor who has most often performed the voice-over for John Travolta, Denzel Washington and many others. He has also acted in Shakespearean plays, notably as the voice of Abra with Leonardo Dicaprio as Romeo in Romeo and Juliet.

== Filmography ==
- 1975: Y'a pas de problème (television series): Un policier et un bandit
- 1977: Les As (television series): Satan
- 1978: Race de monde (television series): Abel Beauchemin
- 1982: (Une vie (album) – Une vie...) (television series): Jacques Richard
- 1992: La Montagne du Hollandais (television series): François Chamberland

== Dubbing ==
=== Film ===
==== Feature-length films ====
Bruce Willis in:

- Mortal Thoughts (Pensées mortelles) (1991): James Urbanski
- Hudson Hawk (Hudson Hawk, gentleman et cambrioleur) (1991): Eddie 'Hudson Hawk' Hawkins
- Striking Distance (Sur les traces de l'ennemi) (1993): Tom Hardy
- Color of Night (La Couleur de la nuit) (1994): Dr. Bill Capa
- Die Hard with a Vengeance (Une journée en enfer – Marche ou crève: Vengeance définitive) (1995): Lieutenant John McClane
- 12 Monkeys (L'Armée des douze singes – 12 singes) (1995): James Cole
- Armageddon (1998 film) (Armageddon) (1998): Harry S. Stamper
- The Siege (Couvre-feu – Le Siège) (1998): Général William Devereaux
- The Sixth Sense (Sixième Sens) (1999): Malcolm Crowe
- The Story of Us (Une vie à deux – Notre histoire) (1999): Ben Jordan
- The Whole Nine Yards (film) (Mon voisin le tueur – Le Nouveau Voisin) (2000): Jimmy 'La Tulipe' Tudeski
- Disney's The Kid (Sale Môme – Le Kid) (2000): Russ Duritz
- Unbreakable (Incassable – L'Indestructible) (2000): David Dunn
- Bandits (Bandits) (2001): Joe Blake
- Hart's War (Mission Évasion – Le Combat du Lieutenant Hart) (2001): Colonel William McNamara
- Sin City (Une histoire de Sin City) (2005): Hartigan
- 16 Blocks (16 blocs – 16 rues) (2006): Jack Mosley
- Lucky Number Slevin (Slevin – Bonne Chance Slevin) (2006): M. Goodkat
- (Le Fermier astronaute) (2006): Colonel Masterson
- Alpha Dog (Alpha Dog (Mâle Alpha) (2007): Sonny Truelove
- Perfect Stranger (Dangereuse Séduction – Parfait Inconnu) (2007): Harisson Hill
- Red (Red) (2010): Frank Moses
- Cop Out (Top Cops – Flics en service) (2010): Jimmy Monroe
- The Expendables (2010 film) (Expendables: Unité Spéciale – Les Sacrifiés) (2010): M. Chapelle
- Looper (Looper) (2012): Joe âgé
- The Expendables 2 (Expendables 2: Unité spéciale – Les Sacrifiés 2: De retour au combat) (2012): M. Chapelle
- A Good Day to Die Hard (Die Hard: Belle journée pour mourir) (2013): John McClane
- Red 2 (film) (Red 2) (2014): Frank Moses
- Sin City: A Dame to Kill For (Sin City: J'ai tué pour elle) (2014): John Hartigan

John Travolta in:

- Look Who's Talking Too (Allô maman, c'est encore moi) (1990): James Ubriacco
- Look Who's Talking Now (Allô maman, c'est Noël) (1993): James Ubriacco
- Get Shorty (Get Shorty – C'est le petit qu'il nous faut) (1995): Chili Palmer
- Phenomenon (Phénomène) (1996): George Malley
- Michael(Michael (film, 1996) – Michael) (1996): Michael
- Face/Off (Volte-face – Double Identité) (1997): Sean Archer – Castor Troy
- Primary Colors (Primary Colors – Couleurs primaires) (1998): Jack Stanton
- A Civil Action (Préjudice – Une action au civil) (1998): Jan Schlichtmann
- The General's Daughter (Le Déshonneur d'Elisabeth Campbell) (1999): Paul Brenner
- Battlefield Earth (Terre, champ de bataille) (2000): Terl
- Lucky Numbers (Le Bon Numéro – Combinaison gagnante) (2000): Russ Richards
- Swordfish (Opération Espadon – Opération Swordfish) (2001): Gabriel Shear
- Domestic Disturbance (L'Intrus – Drame familial) (2001): Frank Morrison
- Basic (Formation extrême) (2003): Thomas « Tom » Hardy
- The Punisher (Le Punisher: Les Liens du Sang) (2004): Howard Saint
- A Love Song for Bobby Long (Love Song – Une ballade pour Bobby Long) (2004): Bobby Long
- Ladder 49(Piège de feu – Échelle 49) (2004): Mike Kennedy
- Hairspray (2007): Edna Turnblad
- Wild Hogs (Bande de sauvages – Les fous de la moto) (2007): Woody Stevens
- The Taking of Pelham 123 (L'Attaque du métro 123 – Pelham 123 – L'ultime station) (2009): Dennis « Ryder » Ford
- Old Dogs (Les deux font la père) (2009): Charlie
- Savages (Sauvages) (2012): Dennis
- Killing Season (Face à Face) (2013): Emil Kovac

Denzel Washington in:

- The Pelican Brief (L'Affaire Pélican) (1993): Gray Grantham
- Philadelphia (Philadelphie) (1993): Joe Miller
- Crimson Tide (USS Alabama – Marée rouge) (1995): Premier officier Ron Hunter
- Courage Under Fire (À l'épreuve du feu – Le Courage à l'épreuve) (1996): Lt-Col. Nathaniel Serling
- The Preacher's Wife (La Femme du pasteur) (1996): Dudley
- The Bone Collector (The Bone Collector – Le Désosseur) (1999): Lincoln Rhyme
- The Hurricane (1999 film) (Hurricane Carter (film) – Hurricane) (2000): Rubin 'Hurricane' Carter
- Remember the Titans (Le Plus Beau des combats – En souvenirs des Titans) (2000): Herman Boone
- Training Day (Training Day) (2001): Alonzo Harris
- John Q. (John Q) (2002): John Quincy Archibald
- The Manchurian Candidate (Un crime dans la tête – Le Candidat Manchou) (2004): Ben Marco
- Inside Man (Inside Man: L'Homme de l'intérieur – L'Informateur) (2006): Détective Keith Frazier
- Déjà Vu (2006 film) (2006): Doug Carlin
- American Gangster (Gangster Américain) (2007): Frank Lucas
- The Great Debaters (Le Grand Débat) (2007): Melvin B. Tolson
- The Book of Eli (Le Livre d'Eli) (2010): Eli
- Safe House (Sécurité rapprochée) (2012): Tobin Frost
- 2 Guns (2 Guns) (2013): Bobby
- The Equalizer (film) (Equalizer (film) – Equalizer) (2014): Robert McCall

Wesley Snipes in:

- The Fan (1996 film) (Le Fan) (1996): Bobby Rayburn
- U.S. Marshals (film) (U.S. Marshals) (1998): Mark J. Sheridan
- Blade (film) (Blade) (1998): Blade
- The Art of War (film) (L'Art de la guerre (film, 2000) – L'Art de la guerre) (2000): Neil Shaw
- Murder at 1600 (Meurtre à la Maison-Blanche) (2000): Inspecteur Harlan Regis
- Blade II (2002): Blade
- Unstoppable (Incontrôlable – Indestructible) (2004): Dean Cage
- Blade: Trinity (Blade: Trinity) (2004): Blade
- Brooklyn's Finest (L'Élite de Brooklyn) (2010): Casanova Philipps

Andy Garcia in:

- Desperate Measures (L'Enjeu) (1998): Frank Conner
- Ocean's Eleven (Ocean's Eleven (film, 2001) – L'inconnu de Las Vegas) (2001): Terry Benedict
- Ocean's Twelve (Ocean's Twelve – Le Retour du Daniel Ocean) (2004): Terry Benedict
- The Lazarus Child (The Lazarus Child) (2004): Jack Heywood
- Twisted (Instincts meurtriers) (2004): Mike Delmarco
- Smokin' Aces (Mise à prix – Coup Fumant) (2006): Stanley Locke
- Ocean's Thirteen (Ocean's Thirteen – Danny Ocean 13) (2007): Terry Benedict
- The Pink Panther 2 (La Panthère rose 2) (2009): Vicenzo

Colin Firth in:

- Shakespeare in Love (Shakespeare in Love) (1998): Lord Wessex
- Bridget Jones's Diary (Le Journal de Bridget Jones) (2001): Mark Darcy
- The Importance of Being Earnest (L'Importance d'être Constant) (2002): Jack
- The Edge of Reason (Bridget Jones: L'Âge de raison) (2004): Mark Darcy
- Mamma Mia! (Mamma Mia !) (2008): Harry Bright
- Dorian Gray (Le Portrait de Dorian Gray) (2009): Lord Henry Wotton
- A Single Man (Un homme au singulier) (2010): George Falconer
- Kingsman: The Secret Service (Kingsman: Services secrets) (2015): Harry Hart / Galahad

William Fichtner in:

- Heat (1995 film) (Heat (film, 1995) – Heat) (1995): Roger Van Zant
- Pearl Harbor (2001): père de Danny
- Equilibrium (2002): Jurgen
- The Dark Knight (Le Chevalier noir) (2008): Le directeur de la National Bank
- Date Night (Crazy Night – Méchante soirée) (2010): le procureur Frank Crenshaw
- Teenage Mutant Ninja Turtles (Ninja Turtles – Les Tortues Ninja) (2014): Eric Sachs

Kurt Russell in:

- Executive Decision (Ultime Décision – Décision au sommet) (1996): Dr. David Grant
- Vanilla Sky (Un Ciel Couleur Vanille) (2001): Dr. Curtis McCabe
- 3000 Miles to Graceland (Destination: Graceland – 3000 Milles de Graceland) (2001): Michael Zane
- Sky High (2005 film) (L’École fantastique – Sky High: École des Super-Héros) (2005): Steve Stronghold/The Commander
- Poseidon (film) (Poséidon (film, 2006) – Poséidon) (2006): Robert Ramsey
- Death Proof (Boulevard de la mort – À l'épreuve de la mort) (2007): Stuntman Mike

Ralph Fiennes in:

- 1993: True Romance: Vincenzo Coccotti (Christopher Walken)
- 1996: The People vs. Larry Flynt (Larry Flynt): Jimmy Flynt (Brett Harrelson)
- 1996: Ransom (La Rançon): Détective James Shaker (Gary Sinise)
- 1997: Air Force One (Air Force One: Avion présidentiel): Major Caldwell (William H. Macy)
- 2004: Dawn of the Dead (L'armée des morts): Frank (Matt Frewer)
- 2004: The Village (Le Village): Auguste Nicholson (Brendan Gleeson)
- 2005: Harry Potter and the Goblet of Fire (film) (Harry Potter et la Coupe de feu (film) – Harry Potter et la Coupe de feu) (2005): (Lord Voldemort)
- 2006: V for Vendetta (film) (V pour Vendetta (film)|V pour Vendetta): V / William Rockwood (Hugo Weaving)
- 2006: The Prestige (Le Prestige): Nikola Tesla (David Bowie)
- 2007: The Mist (Brume): Brent Norton (Andre Braugher)
- 2007: Harry Potter and the Order of the Phoenix (Harry Potter et l'Ordre du phénix) (2007): Lord Voldemort
- 2008: Mad Money (Folles du cash): Don Cardigan (Ted Danson)
- 2008: Definitely, Maybe (Un jour, peut-être|Bien sûr, peut-être): Hampton Roth (Kevin Kline)
- 2008: Drillbit Taylor (Drillbit Taylor, garde du corps|Drillbit Taylor): Jim (Ian Roberts)
- 2008: Street Kings (Au bout de la nuit (film, 2008)|Rois de la rue): Capitaine Biggs (Hugh Laurie)
- 2008: Made of Honor (Le Témoin amoureux|Un amour de témoin): Colin McMurray (Kevin McKidd)
- 2008: Pineapple Express (Ananas express): Ted (Gary Cole)
- 2008: W. (film) (W.: L'Improbable Président): George H. W. Bush (James Cromwell)
- 2008: Max Payne (film) (Max Payne (film)|Max Payne): BB Hensley (Beau Bridges)
- 2008: Appaloosa (film) (Appaloosa): Randall Bragg (Jeremy Irons)
- 2009: Rebellion (Rébellion) (Defiance): Ben (Tomas Arana)
- 2010: (Harry Potter et les Reliques de la Mort (film) – Harry Potter et les Reliques de la Mort) (2010): Lord Voldemort
- 2010: Clash of the Titans (Le Choc des Titans) (2010): (Hadès)
- 2012: Ted (Ted): Sam J. Jones (lui-même)
- 2012: Wrath of the Titans (La Colère des Titans) (2012): Hadès

==== Feature length animation films ====
Montmincy is the voice of the following characters in animated feature films

- 1997: Heracles (Hercule): Hadès
- 2008: Beverly Hills Chihuahua (Le Chihuahua de Beverly Hills): Delgado
- 2008: Horton Hears a Who! (Horton): Vlad
- 2008: WALL-E (WALL-E): Shelby
- 2011: Rango (Rango): Le maire

=== Television ===
==== Television series ====
- MythBusters (MythBusters (French) – Les Stupéfiants): Adam Savage
- Hemlock Grove (TV series) (Hemlock Grove (French) (TV series) – Hemlock Grove): Nicolae Rumancek (Don Francks)

==== Television series – animation ====
- 2003: Les Enfants du feu: Sorgo

=== Video games ===
- 2011: Assassin's Creed: Revelations (Assassin's Creed: Revelations|Assassin's Creed: Revelations): Al Mualim

== See also ==
- Dubbing (filmmaking)

== Notes ==
1. Since 2008, there has been an acceleration in imposing Quebec's language laws, including mandatory dubbing of films, or subtitles for smaller films, where the original language is any language other than French. "We will ask the (American) studios to explain to us how we can ensure, without resorting to a law, that Quebec citizens have access to versions dubbed into French in Quebec"
