= Regency Enterprises =

American entertainment company

Regency Entertainment (USA), Inc. Monarchy Enterprises S.á.r.l.
- Trade name: Regency; New Regency Productions
- Type: Private
- Industry: Film; Television
- Predecessors: Embassy International Pictures N.V.; Regency International Pictures
- Founded: July 12, 1991; 35 years ago
- Founder: Arnon Milchan
- Headquarters: West Hollywood, California, U.S. London, England
- Key people: Yariv Milchan (president and CEO)
- Owners: Arnon Milchan Enterprises
- Divisions: New Regency Productions (80%); New Regency Television International; Double Agent (50%)
- Website: www.newregency.com

Regency Enterprises (Note: Commonly referred to as Regency onscreen, credited as and copyrighting as Regency Entertainment (USA), Inc. in the U.S. and Monarchy Enterprises S.á.r.l. overseas.) is an American film and television production company that was founded by Arnon Milchan. It was founded on July 12, 1991 as the successor to Regency International Pictures, formerly known as Embassy International Pictures N.V.. It has offices in West Hollywood, California and London.

== History ==
=== Origins (1982–1991) ===
Arnon Milchan founded his company as Embassy International Pictures N.V., which held the name for seven years until it was changed to Regency International Pictures. This company originally had no distribution deal of producing films with various studios such as The Ladd Company, Columbia Pictures, TriStar Pictures, Warner Bros., Touchstone Pictures, Vestron Pictures, Universal Pictures and 20th Century Fox, with the latter ending up being the distributor of the majority of Regency's library. It produced films such as Once Upon a Time in America and Q&A, but was shut down in 1991.

In 1990, the company, along with Constantin Film and Cinergi Pictures had started a venture, The Summit Group, its stake was sold off in 1994 and became Summit Entertainment.

=== New Regency (1991–present) ===
On January 15, 1991, Milchan and Regency, as well as Scriba & Deyle of Germany and Canal+ of France, formed a $600 million joint venture to finance 20 films in five years, all of which were to be distributed by Warner Bros. Therefore, Regency International Pictures became the holding company for all Milchan’s investments and was legally renamed as Regency Enterprises (doing business as Arnon Milchan Enterprises) and two new companies (both 100% held by Regency Enterprises) were established to produce films: one to do business in the United States and legally named Regency Entertainment (USA), Inc., one to do business overseas and legally named Monarchy Enterprises S.á.r.l. and both known under the umbrella trade name of Regency or New Regency Productions. The offices of New Regency were located on the Warner Bros. lot.

Founder Arnon Milchan's daughter Alexandra Milchan headed their offshoot "Regency Vision", originally intended as a competitor to companies like New Line Cinema's Fine Line Features, a "specialty features" division.

On March 24, 1999, Regency executive David Matalon joined the supervisory board of Puma AG, an international sports company. At the time, Regency Enterprises (the holding company) was the largest single shareholder in Puma, with more than a 25% stake. The stake was sold for $676 million in May 2003.

On September 9, 1997, Milchan signed a 15-year distribution pact with 20th Century Fox worldwide in all media with the exception of foreign television rights, ending the previous association with Warner Bros. (1991–1999). Fox also funneled $200 million in New Regency, in exchange for a 20% stake in the company. The company's offices were moved to the Fox lot (where they are still located). On January 17, 2011, Fox and New Regency extended the pact, to expire in 2022.

On May 21, 2008, they hired Hutch Parker as co-chairman of the studio. He would eventually left the post on January 11, 2012. In July of that same year New Regency announced that they launched a film production joint venture with British-based entertainment production company Shine Group to launch Shine Pictures with the former's Hutch Parker & Bob Harper joining the new subsidiary along with Shine Group's CEO Elizabeth Murdoch.

In June 2012, New Regency announced that they formed a deal with EMJAG Digital Production and Shine America to create and distribute digital content. Under the deal with EMJAG Digital Productions, New Regency along with Shine America will co-produce and co-finance select digital products under a first-look deal with EMJAG's previous deal with Paramount being transferred to New Regency and Shine America.

In May 2016, New Regency announced that Brad Weston had stepped of the company as CEO and president after five years as Yariv Milchan the son of New Regency's founder Arnon Milchan had joined the company and became their new chairman and CEO.

In January 2019, New Regency re-formed its international sales team to take back control of its international television licensing activities.

The Walt Disney Company inherited Fox's stake in New Regency Productions after Disney acquired 21st Century Fox's assets on March 20, 2019. Following the acquisition, 20th Century Fox and Fox Searchlight Pictures became divisions of Walt Disney Studios and were renamed 20th Century Studios and Searchlight Pictures, respectively, on January 17, 2020. On December 13, 2021, New Regency renewed their global distribution deal with Disney. This includes Disney's handling of global theatrical distribution, home entertainment, and first pay rights for New Regency. (Note: Distributed media for Regency Enterprises's association with Warner Bros. and 20th Century Studios titles handled by Studio Distribution Services in North America and Happinet through its Media Marketing unit in Japan.) New Regency's sales team, led by Charlotte Thorp and primarily based out of London, United Kingdom will handle all other television and SVOD rights after the first pay window as well as other business development.

In May 2022, New Regency joined forces with Black Bear Pictures to launch a documentary production unit entitled Double Agent to produce and finance premium documentaries, with Dana O'Keefe appointed as its president.

In June 2025, New Regency began a partnership with Shamrock Capital.

New Regency has at least 100 films to its credit. The company produced 2013's 12 Years a Slave, 2014's Birdman, and 2015's The Revenant, which earned the company two Academy Awards for Best Picture in a row, and three nominations.

== Regency Television ==
Regency Television is a former joint venture between Regency Enterprises and Fox Television Studios founded in 1998. Regency's best-known television shows include The WB/UPN sci-fi drama Roswell and the Fox sitcoms Malcolm in the Middle and The Bernie Mac Show.

On July 17, 2007, Regency Television shut down all production and closed its business after nine years in operation. On January 17, 2011, New Regency announced a return to the television business after 20th Century Fox extended its distribution business with Regency until 2022.

== New Regency Television International ==
New Regency Television International launched in early 2019. Based out of London and drawing from New Regency's long-established relationships with writing, directing and producing talents, the division is focused on developing and producing high-end, authored and original scripted content for the international marketplace.

== Investments ==
=== Current ===
- New Regency Productions (80%) (a joint venture between Regency Enterprises and 20th Century Studios)
- New Regency Television International
- Double Agent (50%) (a joint venture between New Regency and Black Bear Pictures)

=== Former ===
- Restless Records: Rock recording company, sold to Rykodisc in 2001.
- Puma AG (25%): International sports company. Sold in May 2003.
- BabyFirst (30%): cable channel in U.S. aimed at 0–3 year olds, sold to First Media.

== Films ==
=== Feature films ===
==== 1980's ====
Release date	Title	Distributor	Notes	Budget	Gross (worldwide)
as Embassy International Pictures
February 18, 1983	The King of Comedy	20th Century Fox		$19 million	$2.5 million
June 1, 1984	Once Upon a Time in America	Warner Bros.	co-production with The Ladd Company, PSO International and Rafran Cinematografica	$30 million	$5.3 million
December 18, 1985	Brazil	Universal Pictures	co-production with Brazil Productions and 20th Century Fox	$15 million	$9.9 million
January 31, 1986	Stripper	20th Century Fox		—N/a	$90,000
April 18, 1986	Legend	Universal Pictures	co-production with 20th Century Fox	$25 million	$23.5 million
October 4, 1987	Man on Fire	Tri-Star Pictures	uncredited; co-production with Acteurs Auteurs Associes, 7 Films Cinema, Cima Produzioni, France 3 Cinema and Sep Films	—N/a	$519,596
as Regency International Pictures
February 3, 1989	Who's Harry Crumb?	Tri-Star Pictures	uncredited; co-production with Frostbacks and NBC Productions	—N/a	$10.9 million
March 1989	Big Man on Campus	Vestron Pictures	as Regency International Pictures; direct-to-video release	—N/a	—N/a
December 8, 1989	The War of the Roses	20th Century Fox	uncredited; co-production with Gracie Films; Nominated - Golden Globe Award for Best Motion Picture - Musical or Comedy	$26 million	$160.2 million
December 15, 1989	Family Business	Tri-Star Pictures	co-production with Gordon Company	—N/a	$12.1 million

==== 1990's ====
Release date	Title	Distributor	Notes	Budget	Gross (worldwide)
as Regency International Pictures
March 23, 1990	Pretty Woman	Buena Vista Pictures	uncredited; co-production with Touchstone Pictures and Silver Screen Partners IV; Nominated - BAFTA Award for Best Film; Nominated - César Award for Best Foreign Film; Nominated - Golden Globe Award for Best Motion Picture - Musical or Comedy	$14 million	$463.4 million
April 27, 1990	Q&A	Tri-Star Pictures	co-production with Odyssey Distributors	$6 million	$11.2 million
as Regency Enterprises
March 15, 1991	Guilty by Suspicion	Warner Bros.	uncredited	$16 million	$9.48 million
May 10, 1991	Switch	Warner Bros.	uncredited on domestic releases, credited as Odyssey/Regency internationally; co-production with HBO Pictures and Cinema Plus L.P.	$14 million	$15.5 million
December 20, 1991	JFK	Warner Bros.	co-production with Le Studio Canal+, Alcor Films, Ixtlan Productions and A. Kitman Ho Productions; Nominated - Academy Award for Best Picture; Nominated - Golden Globe Award for Best Motion Picture – Drama	$40 million	$205.4 million
February 28, 1992	The Mambo Kings	Warner Bros.	co-production with Le Studio Canal+ and Alcor Films	$15.5 million	$6.7 million
February 28, 1992	Memoirs of an Invisible Man	Warner Bros.	co-production with Le Studio Canal+, Alcor Films and Cornelius Productions	$30–40 million	$14.4 million
March 27, 1992	The Power of One	Warner Bros.	co-production with Village Roadshow Pictures, Le Studio Canal+ and Alcor Films	$18 million	$2.8 million
May 1, 1992	Turtle Beach	Warner Bros.	co-production with Village Roadshow Pictures	—N/a	$778,535
October 9, 1992	Under Siege	Warner Bros.	co-production with Le Studio Canal+ and Alcor Films	$35 million	$156.6 million
February 5, 1993	Sommersby	Warner Bros.	co-production with Le Studio Canal+ and Alcor Films; theme music later served as basis for its own logo	$30 million	$150.1 million
February 26, 1993	Falling Down	Warner Bros.	co-production with Le Studio Canal+, Alcor Films and Arnold Kopelson Productions	$25 million	$40.9 million
May 28, 1993	Made in America	Warner Bros.	co-production with Le Studio Canal+, Alcor Films, Stonebridge Entertainment and Kalola Productions, Inc.	$22 million	$104 million
July 16, 1993	Free Willy	Warner Bros.	under Warner Bros. Family Entertainment, co-production with Le Studio Canal+, Alcor Films and Donner/Shuler-Donner	$20 million	$153.6 million
August 6, 1993	That Night	Warner Bros.	co-production with Le Studio Canal+ and Alcor Films	$7 million	$20,473
November 24, 1993	George Balanchine's The Nutcracker	Warner Bros.	under Warner Bros. Family Entertainment, co-production with Elektra Entertainment, Robert A. Krasnow Productions and Robert Hurwitz Productions	$19 million	$2.1 million
December 8, 1993	Six Degrees of Separation	MGM/UA Distribution Co.	co-production with Metro-Goldwyn-Mayer and Maiden Movies	$15 million	$6.4 million
December 25, 1993	Heaven & Earth	Warner Bros.	co-production with Le Studio Canal+, Alcor Films, Ixtlan Productions, and Todd-AO/TAE Productions	$33 million	$5.9 million
July 20, 1994	The Client	Warner Bros.	co-production with Alcor Films	$45 million	$117.6 million
August 26, 1994	Natural Born Killers	Warner Bros.	co-production with Alcor Films, Ixtlan Productions and J.D. Productions	$34 million	$50.3 million
September 16, 1994	The New Age	Warner Bros.	co-production with Alcor Films and Ixtlan	N/A	$245,217
September 30, 1994	Second Best	Warner Bros.	co-production with Alcor Films and Sarah Radclyffe/Fron Film	N/A	$86,115
December 2, 1994	Cobb	Warner Bros.	co-production with Alcor Films	N/A	$1.07 million
February 3, 1995	Boys on the Side	Warner Bros.	co-production with Le Studio Canal+, Alcor Films and Hera Productions	$21 million	$23.4 million
July 14, 1995	Under Siege 2: Dark Territory	Warner Bros.	co-production with Seagal/Nasso Productions	$60 million	$104 million
July 19, 1995	Free Willy 2: The Adventure Home	Warner Bros.	under Warner Bros. Family Entertainment, co-production with Le Studio Canal+, Alcor Films and Shuler-Donner/Donner Productions	$31 million	$30 million
September 22, 1995	Empire Records	Warner Bros.	co-production with Alan Riche/Tony Ludwig Productions	$10 million	$303,841
October 27, 1995	Copycat	Warner Bros.		$20 million	$32 million
December 15, 1995	Heat	Warner Bros.	co-production with Forward Pass	$60 million	$187.4 million
July 24, 1996	A Time to Kill	Warner Bros.		$40 million	$152 million
August 16, 1996	Tin Cup	Warner Bros.	co-production with Gary Foster Productions	$45 million	$75.8 million
August 23, 1996	Carpool	Warner Bros.		$17 million	$3.3 million
September 6, 1996	Bogus	Warner Bros.	co-production with Yorktown Productions	$25 million	$4.4 million
September 20, 1996	Sunchaser	Warner Bros.	co-production with Veechio-Appledown Productions	$31 million	$21,508
October 20, 1996	North Star	Warner Bros.	co-production with AFCL Productions, M6, Federal Films, Monarchy Enterprises, Nordic Screen Development, Urania Films, Canal+, Sofinergie 3, Cofimage 6, ProCrep, and The Eurimages Fund of the Council of Europe	$18 million	—N/a
April 18, 1997	Murder at 1600	Warner Bros.	co-production with Arnold Kopelson Productions	N/A	$41.1 million
August 6, 1997	Free Willy 3: The Rescue	Warner Bros.	under Warner Bros. Family Entertainment, co-production with Shuler Donner/Donner	N/A	$3.4 million
September 19, 1997	L.A. Confidential	Warner Bros.	co-production with The Wolper Organization; Nominated – Academy Award for Best Picture; Nominated – BAFTA Award for Best Film; Nominated – Golden Globe Award for Best Motion Picture – Drama; Inducted into the National Film Registry in 2015	$35 million	$126.2 million
October 17, 1997	Breaking Up	Warner Bros.		—N/a	$11,690
October 17, 1997	The Devil's Advocate	Warner Bros.	co-production with TaurusFilm and Kopelson Entertainment	$57 million	$153 million
November 14, 1997	The Man Who Knew Too Little	Warner Bros.	co-production with TaurusFilm and Polar Productions	$20 million	$13.7 million
February 20, 1998	Dangerous Beauty	Warner Bros.	co-production with TaurusFilm and Bedford Falls Productions	$8 million	$4 million
April 10, 1998	City of Angels	Warner Bros.	co-production with TaurusFilm and Atlas Entertainment	$55 million	$198.7 million
July 29, 1998	The Negotiator	Warner Bros.	co-production with TaurusFilm and Mandeville Films	$43.5 million	$88 million
February 5, 1999	Simply Irresistible	20th Century Fox	co-production with TaurusFilm and Polar Productions	$6 million	$4.3 million
April 16, 1999	Goodbye Lover	Warner Bros. Pictures	co-production with TaurusFilm, Gotham Entertainment Group and Lightmotive	$20 million	$1.9 million
April 23, 1999	Pushing Tin	20th Century Fox	co-production with TaurusFilm, Linson Films and Fox 2000 Pictures	$33 million	$8.4 million
April 30, 1999	Entrapment	20th Century Fox	co-production with TaurusFilm, Fountainbridge Films and Michael Hertzberg Productions	$66 million	$212.4 million
May 14, 1999	A Midsummer Night's Dream	Fox Searchlight Pictures	co-production with TaurusFilm and Panoramica	$11 million	$16.1 million
October 15, 1999	Fight Club	20th Century Fox	co-production with TaurusFilm, Linson Films and Fox 2000 Pictures	$63 million	$100.9 million

==== 2000's ====
Release date	Title	Distributor	Notes	Budget	Gross (worldwide)
June 2, 2000	Big Momma's House	20th Century Fox	co-production with TaurusFilm, Friendly Films and Runteldat Entertainment	$30 million	$174 million
October 6, 2000	Tigerland	20th Century Fox	co-production with KirchMedia and Haft Entertainment	$10 million	$148,701
October 20, 2000	Bedazzled	20th Century Fox	co-production with KirchMedia and Trevor Albert Productions	$48 million	$90 million
April 20, 2001	Freddy Got Fingered	20th Century Fox	co-production with Epsilon Motion Pictures and MBST Productions	$14 million	$14.3 million
September 28, 2001	Don't Say a Word	20th Century Fox	co-production with Epsilon Motion Pictures, Village Roadshow Pictures, NPV Entertainment, Furthur Films and Kopelson Entertainment	$50 million	$100 million
October 5, 2001	Joy Ride	20th Century Fox	co-production with Epsilon Motion Pictures, Bad Robot and LivePlanet	$23 million	$36.6 million
November 21, 2001	Black Knight	20th Century Fox	co-production with Epsilon Motion Pictures, Runteldat Entertainment, Cass Film and The Firm, Inc.	$50 million	$40 million
December 21, 2001	Joe Somebody	20th Century Fox	co-production with Epsilon Motion Pictures, Fox 2000 Pictures and Kopelson Entertainment	$38 million	$24.5 million
April 5, 2002	High Crimes	20th Century Fox	co-production with Epsilon Motion Pictures, Monarch Pictures, Manifest Film Company and Janet Yang Productions	$42 million	$63.8 million
April 26, 2002	Life or Something Like It	20th Century Fox	co-production with Epsilon Motion Pictures, ITI Cinema and Davis Entertainment	$40 million	$16.9 million
May 10, 2002	Unfaithful	20th Century Fox	co-production with Epsilon Motion Pictures and Fox 2000 Pictures	$50 million	$119 million
February 14, 2003	Daredevil	20th Century Fox	co-production with Epsilon Motion Pictures, Marvel Enterprises, ITI Cinema and Horseshoe Bay Productions	$78 million	$179.2 million
May 16, 2003	Down with Love	20th Century Fox	co-production with Fox 2000 Pictures, Jinks/Cohen Company, Mediastream Dritte Film GmbH & Co. Beteiligungs KG and Epsilon Motion Pictures	$35 million	$39.5 million
May 30, 2003	Wrong Turn	20th Century Fox	USA distribution only; produced by Summit Entertainment, Constantin Film, Newmarket Films, Media Cooperation One and Stan Winston Studio	$12.6 million	$28.7 million
October 17, 2003	Runaway Jury	20th Century Fox	co-production with Epsilon Motion Pictures and Mojo Films	$60 million	$80.2 million
April 9, 2004	The Girl Next Door	20th Century Fox	co-production with Epsilon Motion Pictures and Daybreak Productions	$20–21 million	$30.4 million
April 23, 2004	Man on Fire	20th Century Fox	co-production with Fox 2000 Pictures, Epsilon Motion Pictures, ITI Cinema and Scott Free Productions	$70 million	$130.3 million
September 24, 2004	First Daughter	20th Century Fox	co-production with Epsilon Motion Pictures, Spirit Dance Entertainment and Davis Entertainment	$30 million	$10.4 million
January 14, 2005	Elektra	20th Century Fox	co-production with Epsilon Motion Pictures, Marvel Enterprises, Horseshoe Bay Productions and SAI Productions	$43–65 million	$57 million
March 25, 2005	Guess Who	Columbia Pictures	co-production with Epsilon Motion Pictures, 3 Arts Entertainment, Tall Trees Productions and Katalyst Media; international distribution by 20th Century Fox	$35 million	$103.1 million
June 10, 2005	Mr. & Mrs. Smith	20th Century Fox	co-production with Epsilon Motion Pictures, Summit Entertainment and Weed Road Pictures	$110 million	$487.3 million
September 30, 2005	Little Manhattan	20th Century Fox	co-production with Epsilon Motion Pictures and Pariah	—N/a	$1.1 million
October 21, 2005	Stay	20th Century Fox	co-production with Epsilon Motion Pictures	$50 million	$8.48 million
November 11, 2005	Bee Season	Fox Searchlight Pictures	co-production with Epsilon Motion Pictures, Bona Fide Productions, i5 Films, Fox Searchlab and Merkel Verwaltungsgesellschaft Productions	$14 million	$6.9 million
January 27, 2006	Big Momma's House 2	20th Century Fox	co-production with Epsilon Motion Pictures, Deep River Films, Firm Films and Runteldat Entertainment	$40 million	$141.5 million
February 17, 2006	Date Movie	20th Century Fox	co-production with Epsilon Motion Pictures	$20 million	$84.8 million
April 21, 2006	The Sentinel	20th Century Fox	co-production with Epsilon Motion Pictures and Furthur Films	$60 million	$78.1 million
May 12, 2006	Just My Luck	20th Century Fox	co-production with Epsilon Motion Pictures, Cheyenne Enterprises and Silvercup Studios	$28 million	$38.2 million
July 21, 2006	My Super Ex-Girlfriend	20th Century Fox	co-production with Epsilon Motion Pictures and Pariah	$30 million	$61 million
November 22, 2006	The Fountain	Warner Bros. Pictures	co-production with Epsilon Motion Pictures, Muse Entertainment Enterprises and Protozoa Pictures; international distribution by 20th Century Fox (except for France, Germany, Switzerland and Austria)	$35 million	$16 million
November 22, 2006	Deck the Halls	20th Century Fox	co-production with Epsilon Motion Pictures	$51 million	$46.8 million
January 26, 2007	Epic Movie	20th Century Fox	co-production with Epsilon Motion Pictures and Paul Schiff Productions	$20 million	$86.9 million
April 6, 2007	Firehouse Dog	20th Century Fox	co-production with C.O.R.E. Digital Pictures and Epsilon Motion Pictures	—N/a	$17.2 million
December 14, 2007	Alvin and the Chipmunks	20th Century Fox	co-production with Dune Entertainment, Fox 2000 Pictures, ITI Cinema and Bagdasarian Productions	$60 million	$361.3 million
January 25, 2008	Meet the Spartans	20th Century Fox	co-production with 3 in the Box	$30 million	$84.6 million
February 14, 2008	Jumper	20th Century Fox	co-production with Hypnotic, Dune Entertainment and Epsilon Motion Pictures	$85 million	$225.1 million
March 14, 2008	Shutter	20th Century Fox	co-production with Vertigo Entertainment	$8 million	$48 million
April 11, 2008	Street Kings	Fox Searchlight Pictures	co-production with 3 Arts Entertainment and Dune Entertainment	$20 million	$65.5 million
May 9, 2008	What Happens in Vegas	20th Century Fox	co-production with 21 Laps Entertainment, Mosaic Media Group, Dune Entertainment and Penn Station Productions	$35 million	$219.3 million
June 3, 2008	The Onion Movie	20th Century Fox Home Entertainment	co-production with 3 Arts Entertainment	—N/a	—N/a
July 11, 2008	Meet Dave	20th Century Fox	co-production with Deep River Productions, Dune Entertainment and Guy Walks Into a Bar Productions	$60 million	$50.7 million
August 15, 2008	Mirrors	20th Century Fox	co-production with Luna Pictures and Enteractive	$35 million	$78.1 million
December 25, 2008	Marley & Me	20th Century Fox	co-production with Fox 2000 Pictures, Sunswept Entertainment and Dune Entertainment	$60 million	$247.8 million
January 9, 2009	Bride Wars	20th Century Fox	co-production with Fox 2000 Pictures, Riche/Ludwig Productions, Birdie Productions and Dune Entertainment	$30 million	$114.7 million
July 31, 2009	Aliens in the Attic	20th Century Fox	co-production with Dune Entertainment and Josephson Entertainment	$45 million	$57.9 million
November 13, 2009	Fantastic Mr. Fox	20th Century Fox	co-production with 20th Century Fox Animation, Indian Paintbrush, and American Empirical Pictures	$40 million	$46.5 million
December 23, 2009	Alvin and the Chipmunks: The Squeakquel	20th Century Fox	co-production with Fox 2000 Pictures, Bagdasarian Productions and Dune Entertainment	$70 million	$443.1 million

==== 2010's ====
Release date	Title	Distributor	Notes	Budget	Gross (worldwide)
June 4, 2010	Marmaduke	20th Century Fox	co-production with Davis Entertainment and Dune Entertainment	$50 million	$83.8 million
June 23, 2010	Knight and Day	20th Century Fox	co-production with Dune Entertainment	$117 million	$261.9 million
August 18, 2010	Vampires Suck	20th Century Fox	co-production with 3 in the Box	$20 million	$81.4 million
October 19, 2010	Mirrors 2	20th Century Fox Home Entertainment	Direct-to-video release	—N/a	—N/a
November 26, 2010	Love & Other Drugs	20th Century Fox	co-production with Fox 2000 Pictures, Dune Entertainment, Stuber Pictures and Bedford Falls Productions	$30 million	$103 million
February 18, 2011	Big Mommas: Like Father, Like Son	20th Century Fox	co-production with Friendly Films, Runteldat Entertainment, The Collective and Dune Entertainment	$32 million	$82.3 million
June 1, 2011	Marley & Me: The Puppy Years	20th Century Fox Home Entertainment	Direct-to-video release	—N/a	—N/a
July 1, 2011	Monte Carlo	20th Century Fox	co-production with Fox 2000 Pictures, Di Novi Pictures, Dune Entertainment and Blossom Films	$20 million	$39.7 million
September 30, 2011	What's Your Number?	20th Century Fox	co-production with Contrafilm	$20 million	$30.4 million
October 28, 2011	In Time	20th Century Fox	co-production with Strike Entertainment	$40 million	$174 million
December 16, 2011	Alvin and the Chipmunks: Chipwrecked	20th Century Fox	co-production with Fox 2000 Pictures, Dune Entertainment, ITI Cinema and Bagdasarian Productions	$80 million	$342.7 million
December 25, 2011	The Darkest Hour	Summit Entertainment	co-production with Bazelevs Company and Jacobson Company; international distribution by 20th Century Fox	$34.8 million	$64.6 million
January 18, 2013	Broken City	20th Century Fox	co-production with 1984 Private Defense Contractors, Emmett/Furla Films, Inferno Distribution, Closest to the Hole Productions, Leverage Entertainment, Black Bear Pictures, Allen Hughes Productions and Envision Entertainment	$35 million	$34.5 million
June 7, 2013	The Internship	20th Century Fox	co-production with 21 Laps Entertainment and Wild West Picture Show Productions	$58 million	$93.5 million
October 4, 2013	Runner Runner	20th Century Fox	co-production with Appian Way Productions and Double Feature Films	$30 million	$62.7 million
November 8, 2013	12 Years a Slave	Fox Searchlight Pictures	U.S distribution only; co-production with River Road Entertainment, Plan B Entertainment and Film4 Productions; international distribution by Summit Entertainment; Academy Award for Best Picture; Golden Globe Award for Best Motion Picture – Drama; Inducted into the National Film Registry in 2023	$20–22 million	$187.7 million
March 28, 2014	Noah	Paramount Pictures	co-production with Protozoa Pictures	$125 million	$362.6 million
June 17, 2014	Joy Ride 3: Roadkill	20th Century Fox Home Entertainment	Direct-to-video release	—N/a	—N/a
October 3, 2014	Gone Girl	20th Century Fox		$61 million	$369.3 million
October 17, 2014	Birdman	Fox Searchlight Pictures	co-production with M Productions, Le Grisbi Productions and Worldview Entertainment; Academy Award for Best Picture; Nominated – Golden Globe Award for Best Motion Picture – Musical or Comedy	$18 million	$103.2 million
October 21, 2014	Wrong Turn 6: Last Resort	20th Century Fox Home Entertainment	co-production with Summit Entertainment and Constantin Film; direct-to-video release	—N/a	—N/a
March 6, 2015	Unfinished Business	20th Century Fox	co-production with Escape Artists	$35 million	$14.4 million
April 17, 2015	True Story	Fox Searchlight Pictures	co-production with Plan B Entertainment	N/A	$5.3 million
May 29, 2015	Aloha	Columbia Pictures	co-production with RatPac Entertainment, Scott Rudin Productions and Vinyl Films; international distribution by 20th Century Fox	$37–52 million	$26.3 million
December 11, 2015	The Big Short	Paramount Pictures	co-production with Plan B Entertainment; Nominated – Academy Award for Best Picture; Nominated – Golden Globe Award for Best Motion Picture – Musical or Comedy	$50 million	$133.4 million
December 18, 2015	Alvin and the Chipmunks: The Road Chip	20th Century Fox	co-production with Fox 2000 Pictures	$90 million	$234 million
December 25, 2015	The Revenant	20th Century Fox	co-production with RatPac Entertainment, Anonymous Content, M Productions and Appian Way Productions; Nominated – Academy Award for Best Picture; Golden Globe Award for Best Motion Picture – Drama	$135 million	$533 million
November 23, 2016	Rules Don't Apply	20th Century Fox	co-production with RatPac Entertainment, Worldview Entertainment, Shangri-La Entertainment, Demarest Films and Taitra	$25 million	$3.9 million
December 21, 2016	Assassin's Creed	20th Century Fox	co-production with Ubisoft Motion Pictures, DMC Films and The Kennedy/Marshall Company	$125 million	$240.7 million
February 17, 2017	A Cure for Wellness	20th Century Fox	co-production with Blind Wink Productions	$40 million	$26.6 million
March 23, 2018	Unsane	Bleecker Street	co-distributed with Fingerprint Releasing; co-production with Extension 765; international distribution by 20th Century Fox	$1.5 million	$14.3 million
November 2, 2018	Bohemian Rhapsody	20th Century Fox	co-production with GK Films and Queen Films; Nominated – Academy Award for Best Picture; Golden Globe Award for Best Motion Picture – Drama	$50–55 million	$903.7 million
November 9, 2018	The Girl in the Spider's Web	Columbia Pictures	co-production with Metro-Goldwyn-Mayer, Scott Rudin Productions, Yellow Bird, The Cantillon Company and Pascal Pictures	$43 million	$35.2 million
November 16, 2018	Widows	20th Century Fox	co-production with Film4, Lammas Park Productions and See-Saw Films	$42 million	$76 million
April 13, 2019	Guava Island	Amazon Studios	Released on Amazon Prime Video	—N/a	—N/a
September 20, 2019	Ad Astra	20th Century Fox	co-production with Bona Film Group, Plan B Entertainment, RT Features, Keep Your Head Productions and MadRiver Pictures	$80–100 million	$132.8 million
October 18, 2019	The Lighthouse	A24	co-production with RT Features; international distribution by Focus Features	$4 million	$18 million
December 25, 2019	Little Women	Columbia Pictures	co-production with Pascal Pictures; Nominated – Academy Award for Best Picture	$40 million	$206 million

==== 2020's ====
Release date	Title	Distributor	Notes	Budget	Gross (worldwide)
October 30, 2020	His House	Netflix	co-production with BBC Films, Vertigo Entertainment and Starchild Pictures	—N/a	—N/a
September 17, 2021	Everybody's Talking About Jamie	Amazon Studios	co-production with Film4 Productions and Warp Films	—N/a	—N/a
March 18, 2022	Deep Water	Hulu	co-production with 20th Century Studios, Film Rites, Entertainment 360, Keep Your Head and Entertainment One; international distribution by Amazon Prime Video	$48.9 million	—N/a
April 22, 2022	The Northman	Focus Features	co-production with Perfect World Pictures and Square Peg; international distribution by Universal Pictures	$70–90 million	$69.6 million
August 31, 2022	I Came By	Netflix	co-production with XYZ Films, Two & Two Pictures and Film4 Productions	—N/a	—N/a
September 9, 2022	Barbarian	20th Century Studios	co-production with Almost Never Films, Hammerstone Studios, BoulderLight Pictures and Vertigo Entertainment	$4 million	$45.4 million
October 7, 2022	Amsterdam	20th Century Studios	co-production with DreamCrew, Keep Your Head, and Corazon Hayagriva	$80 million	$31.2 million
September 29, 2023	The Creator	20th Century Studios	co-production with Entertainment One and Bad Dreams	$80 million	$104 million
December 25, 2023	Occupied City	A24	co-production with Film4, Family Affair Films, Lammas Park and VPRO	—N/a	$151,716
June 21, 2024	The Bikeriders	Focus Features	co-production with Tri-State Pictures	$30–40 million	$36.3 million
October 18, 2024	The Last Stand of Ellen Cole	—N/a	co-production with Automatik, Oddfellows Pictures, QCODE and Subzero Film Entertainment	—N/a	—N/a
November 1, 2024	Blitz	Apple TV+	co-production with Apple Studios, Working Title Films and Lammas Park	—N/a	—N/a
February 20, 2026	Psycho Killer	20th Century Studios	co-production with Constantin Film and Vertigo Entertainment	$10 million	$2.5 million

==== Upcoming ====
Year	Title	Distributor	Notes
Undated films
TBA	Watch Dogs	TBA	co-production with Ubisoft Film & Television
TBA	Eight Perfect Murders	TBA	co-production with Maximum Effort
TBA	Fixation	TBA	co-production with Made Up Stories
TBA	They're Still Here	TBA	co-production with Phantom Four and Good Fear
TBA	Carrier	TBA	co-production with Mortal Media
TBA	Panic Officer	TBA	co-production with RDV Films
TBA	Black Palace	TBA	co-production with Hamm4

== Television ==
=== 1990's ===
Years	Title	Network	Co-production with	Seasons	Episodes
as Regency Enterprises
1994–1995	Free Willy	ABC	Le Studio Canal+ Donner/Shuler-Donner Productions; Nelvana Limited; Warner Bros. Animation	2	21
1995–1996	The Cilent	CBS	Michael Filerman Productions; Warner Bros. Television	1	22
1997–1998	Michael Hayes	CBS	Trotwood Productions; Baumgarten/Prophet Entertainment; Columbia TriStar Television	1	22
as Regency Television
1999–2002	Roswell	The WB (seasons 1–2); UPN (season 3)	Jason Katims Productions; 20th Century Fox Television	3	61
1999	Ryan Caulfield: Year One	Fox	Fox Television Studios	1	8

=== 2000's ===
Year	Title	Network	Co-production with	Notes	Seasons	Episodes
2000–2006	Malcolm in the Middle	Fox	Satin City; Fox Television Studios		7	151
2000	Tucker	NBC	Sudden Entertainment; Fox Television Studios; NBC Studios		1	13
2000–2001	FreakyLinks	Fox	Haxan Films; 20th Century Fox Television		1	13
2001–2006	The Bernie Mac Show	Fox	Wilmore Films; 20th Century Fox Television		5	104
2001–2002	The Education of Max Bickford	CBS	Sugar Mama Productions; Joe Cacaci Productions; 20th Century Fox Television; CBS Productions		1	22
2001–2002	UC: Undercover	NBC	Jersey Television; Chasing Time Pictures; NBC Studios; 20th Century Fox Television		1	13
2002–2003	John Doe	Fox	Camp-Thompson Productions; Fox Television Studios		1	21
2004	Wonderfalls	Fox	Living Dead Guy Productions; Walking Bud Productions; 20th Century Fox Television		1	13
2004	Method & Red	Fox	If I Can Productions; Method Man Enterprises; Background Action, Inc. 20th Century Fox Television		1	13
2004–2005	Listen Up	CBS	CBS Productions; Fox Television Studios		1	22
2005–2006	Living with Fran	The WB	Fringe Producers; On Time and Sober Productions; Jizzy Entertainment; Uh-Oh Productions; Fox Television Studios		2	26
2005–2006	Killer Instinct	Fox	Fox Television Studios		1	13
2006	Thief	FX	Pariah; Sarabande Productions; Fox Television Studios	miniseries	1	6
2006	Windfall	NBC	Joyful Girl Productions; Fox Television Studios		1	13
2006	Help Me Help You	ABC	Pointy Bird Productions; Tire Fire Productions; Fox Television Studios		1	13
2008	New Amsterdam	Fox	Sarabande Productions; Scarlet Fire Entertainment		1	8
2008	The Return of Jezebel James	Fox	Dorothy Parker Drank Here Productions; Fox Television Studios		1	7

=== 2020's ===
Year	Title	Network	Co-production with	Notes	Seasons	Episodes
as New Regency
2021	The Beast Must Die	BritBox (UK); AMC (US)	Scott Free Productions	miniseries	1	5
2022–present	Fraggle Rock: Back to the Rock	Apple TV+	The Jim Henson Company; Fusfeld & Cuthbertson Regional Entertainment		2	28
2023	The Crowded Room	Apple TV+	Apple Studios; Weed Road Productions; EMJAG Productions	miniseries	1	10
2024–present	Mr. & Mrs. Smith	Amazon Prime Video	Gilga; Super Frog; Big Indie Pictures; 20th Television; Amazon MGM Studios		1	8
2024–present	The Edge of Sleep	Amazon Prime Video	QCode; Oddfellows Entertainment; Automatik Entertainment	Television adaptation	1	6
2025	Prime Target	Apple TV+	Scott Free Productions	miniseries	1	8
2026	Malcolm in the Middle: Life's Still Unfair	Hulu	The Jackal Group; New Satin City Productions; 20th Television	miniseries	1	4
2026	Man on Fire	Netflix	Chernin Entertainment; Chapter Eleven; Grey Skies Pictures		1	7

=== Television films and pilots ===
==== 1990's ====
Release date	Title	Network	Co-production with
May 9, 1999	The Hunt for the Unicorn Killer	NBC	Dan Wigutow Productions

==== 2000's ====
Release date	Title	Network	Co-production with
December 20, 2000	How to Marry a Billionaire: A Christmas Tale	Fox	Stu Segall Productions and Fox Television Studios
January 10, 2001	Dodson's Journey	CBS	Firefly Productions and Fox Television Studios
September 1, 2003	L.A. Confidential	Trio	Warner Bros. Television
