= Montminy =

Montminy is a surname. Notable people with the surname include:

- Anne Montminy (born 1975), Canadian diver and lawyer
- Jean-Luc Montminy, Canadian actor
- Jean-Pierre Montminy (1934–2017), Canadian military bandmaster and clarinetist
- Tracy Montminy (1911–1992), American artist and muralist
