= Richard Rogers (sound engineer) =

American sound engineer

- Occupation: Sound engineer
- Years active: 1981-2008

Richard Rogers is an American sound engineer. He won the Oscar for Best Sound for the film Platoon. He has worked on over 120 films since 1981.

== Selected filmography ==
- Platoon (1986)
