= Platoon (board game) =

Board wargame based on movie of same name

- Designers: S. Craig Taylor
- Publishers: Avalon Hill
- Publication: 1986
- Genres: Vietnam War

Platoon is a board wargame released by Avalon Hill in 1986 that, as a licensed tie-in to the film of the same name, simulates tactical small-group combat during the Vietnam War.

== Description ==
Platoon is a two-person board wargame involving groups of individual soldiers in which one player controls American forces, and the other player controls Vietcong and North Vietnamese forces.

=== Components ===
The game box holds

- a two-piece 28" x 18" hex grid map
- a rules sheet
- a battle manual containing scenarios, weapon descriptions, examples of play, optional rules, and suggested reading
- 148 counters and chits representing individual soldiers as well as booby traps, claymore mines, barbed wire, foxholes, and bunkers
- 76 plastic chit holders.

=== Gameplay ===
The game is designed for the novice wargamer and is not complex — all the rules fit on a double-sided sheet of paper. Rather than the traditional "I Go, You Go" alternating turn system, eight American action chits and eight Vietnamese action chits are put in a cup, and are drawn one at a time to determine which player takes the next action.

=== Strategy ===
James Werbaneth advised, "One of the most important lessons for the Platoon player is the absolute necessity of maintaining clear and optimally lethal fields of fire." Werbaneth also advised players to use terrain to their advantage, and to be prudent about how many units to engage in fire combat.

=== Scenarios ===
The game includes four scenarios, each based one of the combat scenes in the Platoon movie.

== Publication history ==
With the release of critically acclaimed film Platoon in 1986, the wargame publisher Avalon Hill attempted to ride the movie's popularity by acquiring the game license and quickly releasing a board wargame designed by S. Craig Taylor.

== Reception ==
Wayne Koh liked the game but didn't understand why claymore mines and booby traps affected all units standing in the same hex, but a hand grenade only affected one soldier. Despite this, Koh found the rest of the rules "simple and easy to understand." Koh warned "The game, like the war, is extremely bloody, and 75% casualties per side is not uncommon during a prolonged firefight. The whole idea is not to completely kill people, but to keep your own forces alive." Koh concluded, "Platoon is a good game, it contains both military, strategic, and educational aspects. It emulates the movie well, which means that its politics may not be suitable to all wargaming enthusiasts."

James Werbaneth warned "for all its apparent simplicity, Platoon demands an extraordinary care and tactical thoughtfulness. Moving soldiers around at random and shooting at every target that looks good for the moment is seldom enough to win a scenario. Platoon proves that simple rules do not necessarily make for a simple game." Werbaneth added, "Platoon rewards tacticians and punishes players whose understanding of the game is no deeper than the letter of the rules. Play is often a matter of firing at shadows and coping with limited intelligence; comprehending the deeper intricacies of the game system is necessary to surmount these obstacles and the incremental structure of the turns." Werbaneth concluded, "Its objective simplicity is what makes Platoon look like a simple game for the novice wargarner. In fact, [game designer] Craig Taylor combined simple mechanics with complex dynamics to make it look easy."

== Reviews ==
- Games #88

== Scenarios ==
In Issue 7 of Battleplan, James Meldrum proposed two new scenarios.

Norman Smith, writing for Games International, also proposed three new scenarios for the game.
