= Platoon (film) =

1986 war film directed by Oliver Stone

- Theatrical release poster by Bill Gold
- Directed by: Oliver Stone
- Written by: Oliver Stone
- Produced by: Arnold Kopelson
- Starring: Tom Berenger; Willem Dafoe; Charlie Sheen
- Cinematography: Robert Richardson
- Edited by: Claire Simpson
- Music by: Georges Delerue
- Production company: Hemdale Film Corporation
- Distributed by: Orion Pictures
- Release date: December 19, 1986
- Running time: 120 minutes
- Country: United States
- Language: English
- Budget: $6 million
- Box office: $138.5 million

Platoon is a 1986 American epic anti-war film written and directed by Oliver Stone, starring Tom Berenger, Willem Dafoe, and Charlie Sheen, with supporting roles by Forest Whitaker, Francesco Quinn, John C. McGinley, Richard Edson, Kevin Dillon, Keith David, Reggie Johnson, Johnny Depp, Mark Moses, Chris Pedersen and Tony Todd. It is the first film of a trilogy of Vietnam War films directed by Stone, followed by Born on the Fourth of July (1989) and Heaven & Earth (1993). The film, based on Stone's experience from the war, follows a new U.S. Army volunteer (Sheen) serving in South Vietnam while his platoon sergeant (Berenger) and his squad leader (Dafoe) argue over the morality in the platoon and of the war itself.

Stone wrote the screenplay based upon his experiences as a U.S. infantryman in South Vietnam, to counter the vision of the war portrayed in John Wayne's The Green Berets. Although he had written scripts for films such as Midnight Express and Scarface, Stone struggled to get the film developed until Hemdale Film Corporation acquired the project along with Salvador. Filming took place in the Philippines in February 1986 and lasted 54 days. Platoon was the first Hollywood film to be written and directed by a veteran of the Vietnam War.

Platoon was released by Orion Pictures on December 19, 1986. Upon its release, Platoon received critical acclaim for Stone's directing and screenplay, cinematography, the battle sequences' realism, and the performances of Sheen, Dafoe, and Berenger. The film was a box office success upon its release, grossing over $138 million domestically against its $6 million budget, becoming the third highest-grossing domestic film of 1986. The film was nominated for eight Academy Awards at the 59th Academy Awards, and won four: Best Picture, Best Director for Stone, Best Sound, and Best Film Editing. Platoon is considered by many critics to be one of the greatest films ever made, particularly within the war genre. In 1998, the American Film Institute placed Platoon at #83 in their "AFI's 100 Years ... 100 Movies" poll. In 2019, the film was selected for preservation in the United States National Film Registry by the Library of Congress as being "culturally, historically, or aesthetically significant".

== Plot ==
In 1967, U.S. Army volunteer Chris Taylor arrives in South Vietnam and is assigned to an infantry platoon of the 25th Infantry Division near the Cambodian border. The platoon is commanded by the young and inexperienced Lieutenant Wolfe, who relies on two experienced non-commissioned officers: the ruthless Staff Sergeant Barnes, and the more compassionate Sergeant Elias.

Taylor participates in a night ambush of an invading North Vietnamese Army force and a rebelling Viet Cong force. Taylor is wounded during the firefight while Gardner, another new replacement, is killed. Taylor returns to base from the aid station and bonds with Elias and his circle of marijuana users ("heads"), a clique distinct from Barnes and his hard-edged followers.

During another patrol, two soldiers are killed by a booby trap while Manny is captured and slain by unseen assailants. The platoon finds Manny's body and search a nearby village, finding a supply cache. Taylor is remorsefully unable to prevent Bunny from murdering a villager. Barnes aggressively interrogates the village chief and murders his wife in view of the villagers. When he also threatens to murder the chief's granddaughter, Elias intervenes and assaults Barnes. Wolfe breaks up the ensuing fight, orders the supplies destroyed and the village razed. Wolfe feigns ignorance when Elias accuses him of not stopping Barnes. Taylor prevents two girls from being gang-raped by some of Barnes' men.

Back at base, company commander Captain Harris warns he will pursue an investigation and court martial anyone found to have killed any civilians, leaving Barnes worried Elias will testify against him. On their next patrol, the platoon is ambushed and pinned down, taking casualties. Wolfe accidentally directs artillery fire onto his own unit, causing more casualties, before Barnes calls it off. Elias asks for three men to intercept flanking enemy troops, a plan Barnes agrees to but only after telling Elias "out here you belong to me". Elias takes Taylor, Rhah and Crawford to intercept flanking enemy troops. Barnes pulls the rest of the platoon back, and goes out to retrieve Elias. Elias is separated from the others and finds Barnes alone, who then takes the opportunity to shoot him. Heading towards the helicopter extraction, he tells Taylor that Elias is dead, but as they fly out they see the wounded Elias chased from the jungle by NVA soldiers and VC guerillas before getting killed.

Realizing Barnes was responsible for Elias' death, Taylor attempts to talk the heads into fragging Barnes in retaliation, not realizing Barnes has overheard them. He enters the abandoned bunker they use for gathering and taunts them. Barnes fights off an attack by Taylor, cutting his face with a push dagger before departing.

The platoon is sent back out to a defensive position. Taylor shares a foxhole with Francis. When a major NVA and VC night assault occurs, much of the platoon is killed, including Wolfe and most of Barnes' followers. An NVA or VC sapper destroys the battalion headquarters in a suicide attack, forcing Captain Harris to call an air strike on their shrinking perimeter. In the chaos, Taylor encounters a wounded Barnes, who attempts to kill Taylor before both are knocked unconscious by the air strike.

Regaining consciousness after sunrise, an injured but walking Taylor picks up a rifle and finds Barnes who is injured and crawling away. Barnes orders Taylor to get him a medic, to which Taylor doesn’t respond. Barnes sees Taylor isn’t acting on the order, and then dares Taylor to shoot him. Taylor shoots him dead. Francis survives the battle unharmed but stabs himself in the leg, reminding Taylor that twice wounded men are returned home. As a helicopter carries the two men away, Taylor sobs as he flies away from the battlefield, reflecting on how his experiences in the war will remain with him.

== Cast ==
- Charlie Sheen as Chris
- Tom Berenger as Sgt. Barnes
- Willem Dafoe as Sgt. Elias
- Keith David as King
- Forest Whitaker as Big Harold
- Francesco Quinn as Rhah
- Kevin Dillon as Bunny
- John C. McGinley as Sgt. O'Neill
- Reggie Johnson as Junior
- Mark Moses as Lt. Wolfe
- Corey Glover as Francis
- Johnny Depp as Lerner
- Chris Pedersen as Crawford
- Bob Orwig as Gardner
- Corkey Ford as Manny
- David Neidorf as Tex
- Richard Edson as Sal
- Tony Todd as Warren
- Dale Dye as Captain Harris
- Paul Sanchez as Doc

== Production ==
=== Development ===
"Vietnam was really visceral, and I had come from a cerebral existence: study ... working with a pen and paper, with ideas. I came back really visceral. And I think the camera is so much more ... that's your interpreter, as opposed to a pen."

— Oliver Stone

The seeds of what would become Platoon began as early as 1968, months after Oliver Stone had completed his own tour of duty fighting in the Vietnam War. Stone first wrote a screenplay called Break, a semi-autobiographical account detailing his experiences with his parents and his time in Vietnam. Stone's active duty service resulted in a "big change" in how he viewed life and the war. Although Break was never produced, he later used it as the basis for Platoon. His screenplay featured several characters who were the seeds of those he developed in Platoon. The script was set to music from The Doors; Stone sent the script to Jim Morrison in the hope he would play the lead (Morrison never responded, but his manager returned the script to Stone shortly after Morrison's death; Morrison had the script with him when he died in Paris). Although Break was never produced, Stone decided to attend film school.

After writing several other screenplays in the early 1970s, Stone worked with Robert Bolt on the screenplay, The Cover-up (it was not produced). Bolt's rigorous approach rubbed off on Stone. The younger man used his characters from the Break screenplay and developed a new screenplay, which he titled Platoon. Producer Martin Bregman attempted to elicit studio interest in the project, but was not successful. Stone claims that during that time, Sidney Lumet was to have directed the film with Al Pacino slated to star had there been studio interest. But, based on the strength of his writing in Platoon, Stone was hired to write the screenplay for Midnight Express (1978).

The film was a critical and commercial success, as were some other Stone films at the time, but most studios were still reluctant to finance Platoon, because it was about the unpopular Vietnam War. After the release of The Deer Hunter and Apocalypse Now, the studios then cited the perception that these films were considered the pinnacle of the Vietnam War film genre as reasons not to make Platoon.

Stone responded by attempting to break into mainstream direction via the easier-to-finance horror genre, but The Hand failed at the box office, and he began to think Platoon would never be made. Instead, he cowrote Year of the Dragon for a lower-than-usual fee of $200,000, on the condition from producer Dino De Laurentiis that he would next produce Platoon. Year of the Dragon was directed by Stone's friend Michael Cimino, who had also helmed The Deer Hunter. According to Stone, Cimino attempted to produce Platoon in 1984.

The Department of Defense refused to support the production of the film due to its depiction of American war crimes, claiming the script was "rife with unrealistic and highly unfavorable depictions of the American soldier" for its depiction of the murder and rape of South Vietnamese civilians by American soldiers, the attempted murder of one US soldier by another, drug abuse and portraying the majority of American soldiers as "illiterate delinquents." The film was also accused of perpetuating racist stereotypes of African-American soldiers.

De Laurentiis secured financing for Platoon, but he struggled to find a distributor. Because De Laurentiis had already spent money sending Stone to the Philippines to scout for locations, he decided to keep control of the film's script until he was repaid. Then Stone's script for what would become Salvador was passed to John Daly of British production company Hemdale. Once again, this was a project that Stone had struggled to secure financing for, but Daly loved the script and was prepared to finance both Salvador and Platoon. Stone shot Salvador first, before turning his attention to Platoon.

=== Casting ===
James Woods, who had starred in Stone's film Salvador, was offered the role of Barnes. Despite his friendship with Stone, he turned it down, later teasingly saying he "couldn't face going into another jungle with [Oliver Stone]". Denzel Washington expressed interest in playing the role of Elias, a character Stone said was based on a soldier he knew in Vietnam. Stone confirmed in a 2011 interview with Entertainment Weekly that Mickey Rourke, Emilio Estevez and Kevin Costner were all considered for the part of Barnes. He believes Costner turned down the role "because his brother had been in Vietnam." Stone also verified in the interview that Keanu Reeves turned down the role of Taylor because of the violence. Kyle MacLachlan also turned down the role of Taylor. Sheen said that he got the part of Taylor, because of Dafoe's nod of approval. Jon Cryer auditioned for the role of Bunny, which eventually went to Kevin Dillon. Crispin Glover also met Stone regarding an unspecific role in the film.

Many Vietnamese refugees living in the Philippines at the time were recruited to act in different Vietnamese roles in the film.

Stone makes a cameo appearance as the commander of the 3d Battalion, 22d Infantry in the final battle, which was based on the historic New Year's Day Battle of 1968 in which he had taken part while on duty in South Vietnam. Dale Dye, who played Captain Harris, the commander of Company B, is a U.S. Marine Corps Vietnam War veteran who also served as the film's technical advisor. The third US Army veteran who appears in the film is a member of the crew who was briefly seen shirtless in the climactic battle.

=== Filming ===
Exterior shooting began on the island of Luzon in the Philippines in February 1986, although the production was almost canceled because of the political upheaval in the country, due to then-president Ferdinand Marcos. With the help of well-known Asian producer Mark Hill, the shoot commenced, as scheduled, two days after Marcos fled the country. Shooting lasted 54 days and cost $6.5 million. The production made a deal with the Philippine military for the use of military equipment. Filming was done chronologically. As a result of the Department of Defense refusing to supply historically-accurate equipment and uniforms, the film instead used equipment belonging to the Armed Forces of the Philippines.

Upon arrival in the Philippines, the cast was sent on an intensive training course, during which they had to dig foxholes and were subjected to forced marches and nighttime "ambushes," which used special-effects explosions. Led by Vietnam War veteran Dale Dye, training put the principal actors—including Sheen, Dafoe, Depp and Whitaker—through an immersive 30-day military-style training regimen. They limited how much food and water they could drink and eat and when the actors slept, fired blanks to keep the tired actors awake. Dye also had a small role as Captain Harris. Stone said that he was trying to break them down, "to mess with their heads so we could get that dog-tired, don't give a damn attitude, the anger, the irritation ... the casual approach to death". Willem Dafoe said "the training was very important to the making of the film", adding to its authenticity and strengthening the camaraderie developed among the cast: "By the time you got through the training and through the film, you had a relationship to the weapon. It wasn't going to kill people, but you felt comfortable with it."

Scenes were shot in Mount Makiling, Laguna (for the forest scenes), Cavite (for the river and village scenes), and Villamor Air Base near Manila.

In 1986, a novelization of the film script, written by Dale Dye, was published. In 2018 actor Paul Sanchez, who played Doc in the movie, made a documentary about the making of the film, entitled Platoon: Brothers in Arms.

== Soundtrack ==
Adagio for Strings
Platoon's theme, composed by Samuel Barber.

The film score was composed by Georges Delerue. Music used in the film includes Adagio for Strings by Samuel Barber, "White Rabbit" by Jefferson Airplane, and "Okie from Muskogee" by Merle Haggard (which is an anachronism, as the film is set in 1967 but Haggard's song was not released until 1969). During a scene in the "Underworld", the soldiers sing along to "The Tracks of My Tears" by Smokey Robinson and The Miracles, which was also featured in the film's trailer. The soundtrack includes "Groovin'" by The Rascals and "(Sittin' On) The Dock of the Bay" by Otis Redding.

== Release ==
Platoon was released in the United States on December 19, 1986, and in the Philippines and the United Kingdom in March 1987, with its release in the latter receiving an above 15 rating for strong language, scenes of violence, and soft drug use.

In its seventh weekend of release, the film expanded from 214 theaters to 590 and became number one at the United States box office with a gross of $8,352,394. It remained number one for four weekends. In its ninth weekend, it grossed $12.9 million from 1,194 theaters over the four-day President's Day weekend, being the first film to gross more than $10 million in a weekend in February and setting a weekend record for Orion.

=== Home media ===
Due to a legal dispute between Hemdale Film Corporation and Vestron Video over home video rights, the film was delayed from its planned October 1987 release. After a settlement was reached, it was finally released on tape on January 22, 1988, through HBO, and then reissued on September 1, 1988, by Vestron. The HBO release generated sales of $24 million from 380,000 videos sold. Vestron reissued the film twice, in 1991 and 1994. It made its DVD debut in 1997 through Live Entertainment. It was released again on VHS in 1999 by PolyGram Video (who briefly held the rights to the film through its purchase of the Epic library). The film was rereleased on DVD and again on VHS in 2001 by MGM Home Entertainment (who now owns the rights to the film through their purchase of the pre-1996 PolyGram Filmed Entertainment library). MGM released the 20th anniversary DVD through Sony Pictures Home Entertainment in 2006 while 20th Century Fox Home Entertainment released the Blu-ray version on May 25, 2011. Shout! Factory released the 4K remastered Blu-Ray on September 18, 2018, and released a 4K Ultra-HD/Blu-ray combo pack on September 13, 2022.

== Reception ==
=== Critical response ===
On Rotten Tomatoes, Platoon has an approval rating of 89% based on 122 reviews, with an average rating of 8.7/10. The site's critical consensus reads, "Informed by director Oliver Stone's personal experiences in Vietnam, Platoon forgoes easy sermonizing in favor of a harrowing, ground-level view of war, bolstered by no-holds-barred performances from Charlie Sheen and Willem Dafoe." On Metacritic, the film has a weighted average score of 92 out of 100, based on 16 critics, indicating "universal acclaim". Audiences polled by CinemaScore gave the film an average grade of "A" on an A+ to F scale.

Roger Ebert gave it four out of four stars, calling it the best film of the year, and the ninth best of the 1980s. Gene Siskel also awarded the film four out of four stars, and observed that Vietnam War veterans greatly identified with the film. In his New York Times review, Vincent Canby described Platoon as "possibly the best work of any kind about the Vietnam War since Michael Herr's vigorous and hallucinatory book Dispatches.

"The film has been widely acclaimed," Pauline Kael wrote, "but some may feel that Stone takes too many melodramatic shortcuts, and that there's too much filtered light, too much poetic license, and too damn much romanticized insanity ... The movie crowds you; it doesn't leave you room for an honest emotion."

However, black journalist Wallace Terry, who spent a two-year tour in Vietnam, and wrote the 1967 Time cover story titled The Negro in Vietnam, criticized the film for its depiction of African-American soldiers in Vietnam. In an interview with Maria Wilhelm of People, he called the film's depiction of black troops "a slap in the face". In the interview, Terry noted that there were no black actors playing officers, and the three notable black soldiers in the film were all portrayed as cowards. He further went on to criticise the film for perpetuating black stereotypes, stating the film "barely rises above the age-old Hollywood stereotypes of blacks as celluloid savages and coons who do silly things". This criticism was echoed by African-American veteran Bennie J. Swans, who stated that "Millions of people are going to accept this movie as an accurate picture of blacks in the war... That makes this a dangerous movie."

Some Vietnam War veterans criticized the film for showing the killing of civilians, drug use among soldiers, and its portrayal of officers as ineffective as adhering to stereotypical views of soldiers. Others praised Stone for a realistic depiction of the war. Some veterans accused Stone of covering up war crimes he had himself witnessed as a soldier by failing to report them to his superiors, given the film was based on his autobiographical experiences.

== Awards and nominations ==
Award	Category	Subject	Result
Academy Awards	Best Picture	Arnold Kopelson	Won
Academy Awards	Best Director	Oliver Stone	Won
Academy Awards	Best Supporting Actor	Tom Berenger	Nominated
Academy Awards	Best Supporting Actor	Willem Dafoe	Nominated
Academy Awards	Best Original Screenplay	Oliver Stone	Nominated
Academy Awards	Best Cinematography	Robert Richardson	Nominated
Academy Awards	Best Film Editing	Claire Simpson	Won
Academy Awards	Best Sound	John K. Wilkinson, Richard Rogers, Charles "Bud" Grenzbach, Simon Kaye	Won
BAFTA Award	Best Editing	Claire Simpson	Won
BAFTA Award	Best Cinematography	Robert Richardson	Nominated
BAFTA Award	Best Direction	Oliver Stone	Won
Directors Guild of America Award	Outstanding Directing – Feature Film	Oliver Stone	Won
Golden Globe Award	Best Director	Oliver Stone	Won
Golden Globe Award	Best Screenplay	Oliver Stone	Nominated
Golden Globe Award	Best Motion Picture – Drama	Arnold Kopelson	Won
Golden Globe Award	Best Supporting Actor – Motion Picture	Tom Berenger	Won
Silver Bear	Best Director	Oliver Stone	Won
Independent Spirit Award	Best Director	Oliver Stone	Won
Independent Spirit Award	Best Screenplay	Oliver Stone	Won
Independent Spirit Award	Best Film	Arnold Kopelson	Won
Independent Spirit Award	Best Male Lead	Willem Dafoe	Nominated
Independent Spirit Award	Best Cinematography	Robert Richardson	Won
Writers Guild of America Award	Best Original Screenplay	Oliver Stone	Nominated

=== Other honors ===
American Film Institute lists:

- AFI's 100 Years...100 Movies: #83
- AFI's 100 Years...100 Thrills: #72
- AFI's 100 Years...100 Movies (10th Anniversary Edition): #86
- AFI's 100 Years...100 Heroes & Villains: Sgt. Bob Barnes - Nominated Villain

In 2011, British television channel Channel 4 voted Platoon as the 6th greatest war film ever made, behind Full Metal Jacket and ahead of A Bridge Too Far.

== Board and Video games ==
- Platoon, a board wargame published by Avalon Hill in 1986 to attract novice wargamers into the hobby.
- Platoon, a shooter video game, was developed and published by Ocean Software in 1988
- Platoon (2002), also known as Platoon: The 1st Airborne Cavalry Division in Vietnam, a real-time strategy game for Microsoft Windows based on the film, was developed by Digital Reality and published by Monte Cristo and Strategy First.

== See also ==
- List of Vietnam War films
  - Full Metal Jacket, a 1987 Vietnam War film
