= Twisted (2004 film) =

2004 American psychological thriller film

- Theatrical release poster
- Directed by: Philip Kaufman
- Written by: Sarah Thorp
- Produced by: Barry Baeres; Anne Kopelson; Arnold Kopelson; Florina Massbaum; Linne Radmin
- Starring: Ashley Judd; Samuel L. Jackson; Andy García; David Strathairn; Russell Wong; Mark Pellegrino
- Cinematography: Peter Deming
- Edited by: Peter Boyle
- Music by: Mark Isham
- Production companies: Intertainment AG; Kopelson Entertainment
- Distributed by: Paramount Pictures (Select territories); Summit Entertainment (International)
- Release date: February 27, 2004
- Running time: 97 minutes
- Country: United States
- Language: English
- Budget: $50 million
- Box office: $41 million

Twisted is a 2004 American psychological thriller directed by Philip Kaufman, written by Sarah Thorp, and starring Ashley Judd, Samuel L. Jackson, and Andy García. The film is set in San Francisco. Twisted was released by Paramount Pictures on February 27, 2004. The film was widely panned by critics, and was a box-office bomb, grossing $41 million against a $50 million budget.

== Plot ==
Having solved a high-profile case involving serial killer Edmund Cutler, a case ending with her being taken hostage before managing to overpower and arrest him. Officer Jessica Shepard, of the San Francisco Police Department, is transferred to the homicide division and promoted to the rank of inspector. Captain John Mills, her foster father and her deceased father's former partner, also serves as her mentor. Shepard is an alcoholic and nymphomaniac, carrying the emotional burden of her father murdering some of her mother's extra-marital lovers, then Shepard's mother and himself.

When one of Shepard's former one-night stands is brutally murdered, Shepard and her new partner, Mike Delmarco, are assigned to the case. Shepard admits that she had slept with the victim yet remains assigned to the case. A few days later, another of Shepard's numerous one-night stands is murdered and soon the police come to the conclusion that the killer is stalking Shepard. At Mills' insistence, Shepard remains on the case to bait out the killer.

As investigations progress, Shepard keeps having alcoholic blackouts at night, having already had them on the nights of the two murders. She confides this to Mills, who encourages her to carry on.

Shepard discovers a third murder, Cutler's defense attorney Ray Porter, whom she also had previously had sex with, who had summoned her via note to meet him that morning. Inspector Dale Becker focuses the investigation on Shepard herself, due to Shepard's fleeting sexual relationship with the victims and her occasional flashes of violent behaviour in the line of police duty. Shepard begins to fear that she is becoming like her father and committing similar murders, especially after a fourth of her former lovers is murdered, SFPD Officer Jimmy Schmidt – Shepard wakes up with Schmidt's corpse in her bed. In each case, the murder seems to have been committed using a yawara. Shepard is skilled in delivering blows with a yawara, so she is arrested and questioned for the murders but is bailed by Mills after blood work evidence undertaken by pathologist Lisa reveals that Shepard's blood had strong amounts of rohypnol, which means she was incapacitated during the Schmidt murder and thus cannot have committed the crime.

Mills tells Shepard that he suspects Delmarco of being the killer, Delmarco having grown increasingly close to Shepard during the course of the investigation. The two turn up at Delmarco's quayside home to question him. Mills serves Delmarco wine laced with rohypnol to incapacitate him, upon which Shepard realises that Mills is the true killer based on how he says they're now "in this together", while he sets up the scene to look as if Delmarco will commit suicide, akin to how her father had looked when he supposedly committed suicide. Mills admits he killed all of Shepard's lovers, as well as her parents and her mother's lovers, because he considered it his mission to prevent her growing up to be a dissolute woman like her mother. As her father's partner, Mills had felt the responsibility to inform him that his wife was a nymphomaniac, which drove him insane. Furthermore, as he himself had an illicit affair with Shepard's mother, Mills felt the need to kill her lovers, ashamed that he helped destroy his partner's marriage and drove him insane. Mills then decided to put him out of his misery by killing him.

Shepard secretly transmits Mills's confession to other police officers on a mobile phone, allowing her old partner Wilson to track them down. When Mills tries to shoot her and Delmarco, Shepard shoots him in the chest, killing him and causing him to fall off a dock into the water.

== Cast ==
- Ashley Judd as SFPD Inspector Jessica Shepard
- Samuel L. Jackson as SFPD Captain John Mills
- Andy García as SFPD Inspector Mike Delmarco
- David Strathairn as Doctor Frank
- Russell Wong as Lieutenant Tong
- Camryn Manheim as Lisa
- Mark Pellegrino as SFPD Officer Jimmy Schmidt
- Titus Welliver as SFPD Inspector Dale Becker
- D. W. Moffett as Ray Porter
- Richard T. Jones as SFPD Sergeant Wilson Jefferson
- Leland Orser as Edmund Cutler

== Production ==
In February 2002, it was announced producer Arnold Kopelson and Paramount Pictures were in the process of negotiating a just under seven figure purchase of Sarah Thorp's spec script Blackout about the daughter of a serial killer who now works as a cop and comes to fear she might be a suspect in a rash of killings she's investigating. In August of that year, it was announced Philip Kaufman was set to direct (and had provided some uncredited rewrites to the script) with Ashley Judd, Andy Garcia and Samuel L. Jackson as the leads with shooting taking place in San Francisco, California.

== Reception ==
=== Critical response ===
Despite its well-established director and cast, Twisted was universally panned by critics. On the review aggregator website Rotten Tomatoes, 3% of 136 critics' reviews are positive, with an average rating of 3.2/10. The website's consensus reads: "An implausible, overheated potboiler that squanders a stellar cast, Twisted is a clichéd, risible whodunit." The film is one of the lowest-rated on the site. Metacritic, which uses a weighted average, assigned the film a score of 26 out of 100, based on 34 critics, indicating "generally unfavorable" reviews. Audiences polled by CinemaScore gave the film an average grade of "C" on an A+ to F scale.

William Thomas writing for Empire magazine described the role-reversal of the film as "contrived", while allowing that the film "may dole out a few guilty pleasures".

=== Box office ===
The film earned $25,198,598 in the United States and Canada and $15,756,005 in other territories for a combined worldwide gross of $40,954,603—well below the film's production budget of $50 million.
