= Murder at 1600 =

- Theatrical release poster
- Directed by: Dwight Little
- Written by: Wayne Beach; David Hodgin
- Produced by: Arnold Kopelson; Arnon Milchan
- Starring: Wesley Snipes; Diane Lane; Alan Alda; Daniel Benzali; Ronny Cox; Dennis Miller
- Cinematography: Steven Bernstein
- Edited by: Leslie Jones; Billy Weber
- Music by: Christopher Young
- Production companies: Regency Enterprises; Kopelson Entertainment
- Distributed by: Warner Bros.
- Release date: April 18, 1997
- Running time: 107 minutes
- Country: United States
- Language: English
- Box office: $41.1 million

Murder at 1600 is a 1997 American action thriller film directed by Dwight Little and written by Wayne Beach and David Hodgin. It stars Wesley Snipes, Diane Lane, Alan Alda, Daniel Benzali, Ronny Cox and Dennis Miller and follows a homicide detective who works with a secret service agent to investigate the murder of a young woman at the White House and uncover its conspiracy.

== Plot ==
In a restroom in the White House, a janitor finds secretary Carla Town dead. Metropolitan Police homicide detective Harlan Regis, whose apartment block is awaiting demolition in favor of a parking lot, is put on the case. At the White House, Regis is introduced to U.S. Secret Service Director Nick Spikings, National Security Advisor Alvin Jordan, and Secret Service agent Nina Chance. Spikings assigns Chance, a former Olympic gold-medal sharpshooter, to keep an eye on Regis.

Parallel to this, the White House has to deal with an impending international crisis: President Jack Neil has been trying to deal with a situation where American servicemen are being held hostage in North Korea, and some people—including several members of his inner circle, led by Vice President Gordon Dylan—think that Neil is not handling it the right way. Some people think that Neil should send troops to North Korea to rescue the hostages, but he does not want to risk a potential second Korean War.

White House janitor Cory Allen Luchessi was apparently unaccounted for on the night of the murder and had once made a pass at Carla. He is arrested and questioned, but his testimony and a clearly set-up piece of evidence lead Regis to suspect that the Secret Service may be involved. That night, Regis finds his apartment burgled; the culprit escapes, and in a subsequent search, a hidden bug is found.

In a picture of Carla, Regis sees Burton Cash, the Secret Service agent assigned to Kyle Neil, the president's son. Regis figures out that Kyle had sex with Carla on the night of the murder. At a dance club, Regis talks with a young woman who says that Kyle once bragged that he once shared a mistress with his father. Carla's uncle's company, Brookline Associates, is the president's leading East Coast fundraiser and also owns the apartment that Carla lived in.

Regis eventually discovers that Chance once was Kyle's bodyguard herself. When he confronts her, Chance explains that one night she discovered Kyle beating up his girlfriend. The Secret Service covered up the beating so that Kyle would not be arrested for assault, and Chance asked to be reassigned and was replaced by Cash. Upon being confronted by Regis, Kyle denies that he murdered Carla, but provides a special piece of information: among the bookings she made, Carla supposedly also ordered a car - despite not having a driver's license. Later on, Regis and Chance discover that the most recent entries in Carla's appointment book were forged.

With some clues left by Jordan, Regis finds out that Spikings has withheld several surveillance tapes from the night of the murder. Regis goes to Spikings' residence to question him; Spikings is willing to show the tape but is suddenly killed by a sniper. However, Regis and Chance escape the gunfire with the tape. They learn that the sniper was Carla's murderer and that Jordan engineered the murder in order to blackmail Neil into resigning, which would allow Dylan to assume office and have troops sent to North Korea.

Regis, Chance, and Regis's partner Stengel enter the White House tunnels. The sniper pursues them and wounds Stengel, but Chance manages to kill him. Pursued by the Secret Service, Regis just barely manages to get in contact with Neil and present him with the evidence of Jordan's conspiracy. Jordan attempts to shoot Neil, after being punched in the face, only for his shot to be intercepted by a handcuffed Chance, and he is killed by the Secret Service. Chance and Stengel are brought to a hospital, where they recover from their injuries. In gratitude for his rescue, Neil asks Regis if there is anything he can do, whereupon Regis brings up his impending eviction.

== Cast ==
- Wesley Snipes as Detective Harlan Regis
- Diane Lane as Secret Service Agent Nina Chance
- Daniel Benzali as Secret Service Agent Nick Spikings
- Dennis Miller as Detective Stengel
- Alan Alda as National Security Advisor Alvin Jordan
- Ronny Cox as President Jack Neil
- Diane Baker as First Lady Kitty Neil
- Tate Donovan as First Son Kyle Neil
- Harris Yulin as General Clark Tully
- Tom Wright as Secret Service Agent Cooper
- Nicholas Pryor as Paul Moran
- Charles Rocket as Jeffrey Arthur Brose
- Nigel Bennett as Secret Service Agent Burton Cash
- Tony Nappo as Corey Luchessi
- George R. Robertson as Mack Falls
- Tamara Gorski as Young Woman in Bar
- David Gardner as Speaker of the House
- Douglas O'Keefe as the Sniper/Assassin
- Mary Moore as Carla Town
- Chris Gillet as Vice President Gordon Dylan

== Production ==
In March 1994, it was reported that Arnold Kopelson and Regency Enterprises had acquired the script Executive Privilege from Wayne Beach and David Hodgin for $400,000 against $750,000. The script, which was described as In the Line of Fire meets The Pelican Brief followed a Washington D.C. cop who goes against the directives of the Director of the United States Secret Service to investigate a murder in the White House in which members of the first family are suspects.

Dwight H. Little was hired by Warner Bros. Pictures to direct the film after executives were satisfied with his work on Free Willy 2: The Adventure Home

=== Development ===
Producer Arnold Kopelson was attracted to Murder at 1600, having said that "lately, the White House has been vulnerable to a surprisingly wide variety of assaults," and along with producer Arnon Milchan offered the script to director Dwight Little, who accepted as despite his action film experience he had never made a suspense film, "and political thrillers are probably my favorite movie genre; I love those seminal conspiracy movies of the '70s."

=== Casting ===
The filmmakers then invited Wesley Snipes, considering him to have the physicality, intelligence and humor required for Harlan Regis, and Snipes accepted for the depth of the character and "the opportunity to do a suspense role, which is usually reserved for more mature actors." Diane Lane was attracted by the role of Agent Chance because "she stands by her personal code," and Lane had the markswoman experience required for the role.

=== Filming ===
Although scenes were filmed in Washington, D.C., primary locations were in Toronto, Canada and nearby locations in Ontario. As Absolute Power was occupying the Oval Office set built for Dave, a new Oval Office was built at Cinespace Film Studios in Kleinburg. The film crew made many visits to the White House for reference in making what production designer Nelson Coates described as "the most architecturally accurate" recreation of the room. The Oval Office still stands at the studio, and has been used in productions such as Dick and The Sentinel. When the script called for the shooting of a graphic sex scene in the Oval Office, Warner Bros. initially objected feeling the sequence was too outrageous and wanted the filmmakers to switch the location to a side room but producer Arnold Kopelson defended the scene claiming the controversy would be a major selling point. After the Clinton–Lewinsky scandal erupted in 1998, one year after the film's release, director Little remarked, "Not so crazy now, is it? ".

== Release ==
=== Theatrical ===
Murder at 1600 premiered in Los Angeles, California on April 14, 1997.

According to director Dwight H. Little Murder at 1600 performed very well at test screenings. When word got back to the Warner Bros. offices about the excellent performance of the film's test screenings, a representative from Malpaso Productions learned of the film and took the news back to Clint Eastwood whose Malpaso had just produced the very similarly themed Absolute Power in which Eastwood also starred and directed. After learning of the film, Eastwood used his influence with Warner Bros. executives Bob Daley and Terry Semel to demand that the release of Murder at 1600 be pushed back from its January 1997 release date so Absolute Power could be released first. Little attributed the change in release dates to the film's lackluster business as being released after Absolute Power gave the impression that Murder at 1600 was a copycat.

== Reception ==
=== Box office ===
The film was a box office disappointment. It was No. 3 with $7,962,268 during its opening weekend, and went on to make a total of $25,804,707 in the US.

=== Critical response ===
On the review aggregator website Rotten Tomatoes, 32% of 34 critics' reviews are positive. Metacritic, which uses a weighted average, assigned the film a score of 48 out of 100, based on 17 critics, indicating "mixed or average" reviews.

In retrospect, Director Dwight Little said: “I do like the movie a lot. It’s just a Hollywood movie. It’s a police procedural but it’s good“. About the lukewarm reception, Little said that he had been promised Murder at 1600 would be released before Absolute Power. When Clint Eastwood heard that Murder at 1600 was getting positive test screenings, Little said Eastwood convinced Warner Bros. to release Absolute Power first, causing Murder at 1600 to look like a copycat.
