= Arnold Kopelson =

American film producer

- Born: February 14, 1935; New York City, U.S.
- Died: October 8, 2018 (aged 83); Beverly Hills, California, U.S.
- Occupation: Film producer
- Spouses: Joy Stern (m. 1959; died 1975) Anne Feinberg (m. 1976)
- Children: 3
- Awards: Best Picture; 1986, Platoon

Arnold Kopelson (February 14, 1935 – October 8, 2018) was an American film producer. Among his credits are Platoon, Seven, Outbreak, The Fugitive, Eraser and The Devil's Advocate.

== Life and career ==
Kopelson was born in Brooklyn, New York. After earning a Doctorate in Jurisprudence from New York Law School, Kopelson practiced entertainment and banking law, specializing in motion picture financing, and for many years acted as counsel to numerous banks and financial institutions serving the motion picture industry.

Kopelson later formed Inter-Ocean Film Sales, Ltd. with Anne Feinberg, who would become his wife, to represent independent motion picture producers in licensing their films throughout the world and also to finance motion picture production. The Kopelsons produced films together.

Kopelson produced 29 motion pictures. He was honored with an Academy Award for Best Picture, a Golden Globe Award, and an Independent Spirit Award, all for his production of Platoon. He received a Best Picture Academy Award nomination for his production of The Fugitive. Kopelson's films have been collectively responsible for 17 Academy Award nominations and over $3 billion in worldwide receipts.

Kopelson was named Producer of the Year by The National Association of Theatre Owners, was honored with a Lifetime Achievement in Filmmaking Award from Cinema Expo International, received the Motion Picture Showmanship Award from the Publicist Guild of America, and was inducted into Variety's Show Biz Expo Hall of Fame. He has also received other awards for his productions of Outbreak, Seven, and The Devil's Advocate and was further honored by the Deauville Film Festival with its highest award for his significant contribution to the entertainment industry. In 1987, he sued film producer Hemdale Film Corporation for handling of takes on Platoon, claiming that he had received $25 million from grosses of $250 million that the film had generated to date.

In 1989, the company struck its first studio deal, that of Warner Bros. Pictures, to finance successful box office hits, like The Fugitive and Outbreak. In 1990, he, via Inter-Ocean Film Sales, bought out the rights to Solar Crisis.

With Paramount Pictures, Kopelson produced Twisted, starring Samuel L. Jackson, Andy García and Ashley Judd, which was directed by Philip Kaufman; and with 20th Century Fox, Don't Say a Word, starring Michael Douglas, and Joe Somebody, starring Tim Allen.

Kopelson also produced A Perfect Murder, also starring Michael Douglas and Gwyneth Paltrow, U.S. Marshals, starring Tommy Lee Jones, and the Costa Gavras-directed film, Mad City, starring Dustin Hoffman and John Travolta.

His other films included Eraser, starring Arnold Schwarzenegger; Falling Down, starring Michael Douglas and Robert Duvall; Out for Justice, starring Steven Seagal; Triumph of the Spirit, starring Willem Dafoe; and Murder at 1600, starring Wesley Snipes and Diane Lane.

For many years, Kopelson served on the Executive Committee of the Producers Branch of the Academy of Motion Picture Arts and Sciences and was a member of the Board of Mentors of the Peter Stark Motion Picture Producing Program at the University of Southern California. In 2001, Kopelson Entertainment has a first look deal with Paramount Pictures.

Kopelson lectured on filmmaking at Harvard Business School, American Film Institute, Tisch School of the Arts at New York University, New York Law School, the Writers Guild of America, the Independent Feature Project West, The Kagan Seminar, University of Southern California, and University of California at Los Angeles, among other places, and also wrote several articles about motion picture financing. In 1998, Kopelson received the New York Law School Distinguished Alumnus Award for Lifetime Achievement.

Kopelson was a member of the Board of Directors of CBS Corporation from March 2007 until September 9, 2018. NASDAQ reported that Kopelson was removed as a director in an out of court legal settlement between CBS, National Amusements and the Redstone Family, who were in litigation in the Delaware Chancery Court over control of CBS. His removal was reported to the Securities and Exchange Commission on September 9, 2018.

== Personal life ==
Kopelson married twice. In 1959 he married Joy (née Stern). They had a daughter, Stephanie Lisa Kopelson Goldman, and two sons, Peter Laurence Kopelson and Evan Jared Kopelson. His first wife died of cancer in 1975, and in 1976, he married his business partner and former secretary, Anne Feinberg.

Kopelson died at his home in Beverly Hills on October 8, 2018, at 83.

== Filmography ==
He was a producer in all films unless otherwise noted.

=== Film ===
Year	Film	Credit	Notes
1978	The Legacy	Executive producer	
1979	Lost and Found	Executive producer	
1980	Night of the Juggler	Executive producer	
1980	Foolin' Around		
1980	Final Assignment	Executive producer	
1981	Dirty Tricks	Executive producer	
1981	Porky's	Executive producer	
1984	Gimme an 'F'	Executive producer	
1986	Platoon		
1989	Warlock	Executive producer	
1989	Triumph of the Spirit		
1990	Fire Birds	Executive producer	
1991	Out for Justice		
1993	Falling Down		
1993	The Fugitive		
1995	Outbreak		
1995	Seven		
1996	Eraser		
1997	Murder at 1600		
1997	Mad City		
1997	The Devil's Advocate		
1998	A Perfect Murder		
1998	U.S. Marshals		
2001	Don't Say a Word		
2001	Joe Somebody		
2004	Twisted		Final film as a producer

Miscellaneous crew

Year	Film	Role
1977	The Ransom	Executive in charge of production: Inter-Ocean Films
1979	Lost and Found	Presenter

Thanks

Year	Film	Role
2014	Alien Abduction	The producers would like to thank
2016	Rising Fear	The producers wish to thank

=== Television ===
Year	Title	Credit	Notes
1994	Past Tense	Executive producer	Television film
1994	Frogmen	Executive producer	Television film
2000−01	The Fugitive	Executive producer	
2001	Thieves	Executive producer	
2012	Pure Evil	Executive producer	

As an actor

Year	Title	Role
1992	2000 Malibu Road	None
