= The Fugitive (2020 TV series) =

American television series

- Official series logo
- Genre: Action thriller; Crime drama; Mystery; Conspiracy thriller
- Based on: The Fugitive by Roy Huggins
- Developed by: Nick Santora
- Directed by: Stephen Hopkins
- Starring: Boyd Holbrook; Kiefer Sutherland; Natalie Martinez; Tiya Sircar
- Music by: Tony Morales
- Country of origin: United States
- Original language: English
- No. of episodes: 14

Production
- Executive producers: Stephen Hopkins; Basil Iwanyk; Tom Lassally; Nick Santora; Albert Torres
- Producer: Don Tardino
- Running time: 6–9 minutes
- Production companies: BlackJack Films; 3 Arts Entertainment; Thunder Road Films; Warner Bros. Television

Original release
- Network: Quibi
- Release: August 3 – August 18, 2020

The Fugitive is an American action thriller television series directed by Stephen Hopkins and developed by Nick Santora for Quibi. Classified as a contemporary update to the plot from the 1963 television series and its 1993 film adaptation, albeit with new characters, it serves as the fifth release in the titular franchise.

The series premiered on August 3, 2020. Episodes are between six and nine minutes long.

== Premise ==
A bomb explodes in a Los Angeles subway train. Mike Ferro, a blue-collar worker who was in the train, is wrongfully accused by the press. While concerned about his wife and 10-year-old daughter, faulty evidence and a scoop-hunting journalist convince everyone about his responsibility. Mike must prove his innocence by uncovering the real perpetrator before the cop heading the investigation can apprehend him.

== Cast ==
- Boyd Holbrook as Mike Ferro
- Natalie Martinez as Allison Ferro
- Tiya Sircar as Pritti Patel
- Brian Geraghty as Colin Murphy
- Genesis Rodriguez as Detective Sloan Womack
- Shareeka Epps as Ronnie Lawson
- Daniel David Stewart as Stamell
- Kiefer Sutherland as Detective Clay Bryce
- Glenn Howerton as Jerry

== Episodes ==
No.	Title	Directed by	Teleplay by	Original release date
1	"Wrong Place, Wrong Time"	Stephen Hopkins	Nick Santora; Story by : Nick Santora and Albert Torres	August 3, 2020
While putting his life back together, ex-con Mike Ferro finds himself in the middle of a terrorist attack.
2	"Smiles for the Camera"	Stephen Hopkins	Nick Santora; Story by : Nick Santora and Albert Torres	August 3, 2020
Unscrupulous investigative journalist Pritti Patel and the LAPD investigate the terrorist attack.
3	"Run!"	Stephen Hopkins	Nick Santora; Story by : Nick Santora and Albert Torres	August 3, 2020
4	"Going Underground"	Stephen Hopkins	Nick Santora; Story by : Nick Santora and Albert Torres	August 4, 2020
5	"When Mike Met Clay"	Stephen Hopkins	Nick Santora; Story by : Nick Santora and Albert Torres	August 5, 2020
6	"A Lifeline"	Stephen Hopkins	Nick Santora; Story by : Nick Santora and Albert Torres	August 6, 2020
7	"Again"	Stephen Hopkins	Nick Santora; Story by : Nick Santora and Albert Torres	August 7, 2020
8	"Hunted Becomes the Hunter"	Stephen Hopkins	Nick Santora; Story by : Nick Santora and Albert Torres	August 10, 2020
9	"C. Bravo, Esq."	Stephen Hopkins	Nick Santora; Story by : Nick Santora and Albert Torres	August 11, 2020
10	"Getting the Gang Back Together"	Stephen Hopkins	Nick Santora; Story by : Nick Santora and Albert Torres	August 12, 2020
11	"When Mike Met Ronnie"	Stephen Hopkins	Nick Santora; Story by : Nick Santora and Albert Torres	August 13, 2020
12	"Changing Direction"	Stephen Hopkins	Nick Santora; Story by : Nick Santora and Albert Torres	August 14, 2020
13	"When Mike Met Colin"	Stephen Hopkins	Nick Santora; Story by : Nick Santora and Albert Torres	August 17, 2020
14	"How It All Ends"	Stephen Hopkins	Nick Santora; Story by : Nick Santora and Albert Torres	August 18, 2020

== Production ==
=== Development ===
The series was announced in July 2019, to be a part of the upcoming Quibi streaming service. In September, Stephen Hopkins was brought on to direct, with filming beginning in October.

In September 2019, Boyd Holbrook and Kiefer Sutherland were cast to star in the series. In November, Tiya Sircar was added to the cast. In December 2019, it was announced that several new cast members would be joining the lineup Natalie Martinez, Brian Geraghty, Genesis Rodriguez and Keilani Arellanes.

== Release ==
On February 1, 2020, the first teaser trailer was released.

== See also ==
- The Fugitive (2000 TV series)
