= The Fugitive (franchise) =

Film franchise article

- Official franchise logo, as released in 1993.
- Created by: Original story by Roy Huggins
- Original work: The Fugitive
- Owners: Warner Bros. Entertainment (Skydance)
- Years: 1963–present

The Fugitive franchise consists of American action-thriller mystery-crime installments via film and television mediums. The franchise is composed of two theatrical films and three television series. Based on an original story by Roy Huggins for the titular 1960s television series, the plot centers around innocent individuals who are wrongfully convicted after they are framed for criminal acts they did not commit. Each installment details their eventual escape from their capture by law enforcement, and the ensuing investigative manhunt that follows. As accomplished investigators are quickly on their trail in trying to recapture them, they frantically search to find the proof of their innocence and exoneration for their name.

The franchise is intended to continue, with a reboot film in development.

== Films ==
Film	U.S. release date	Director	Screenwriter(s)	Story by	Producer(s)
The Fugitive	August 6, 1993	Andrew Davis	David Twohy & Jeb Stuart	David Twohy	Anne Kopelson, Arnold Kopelson and Keith Barish
U.S. Marshals	March 6, 1998	Stuart Baird	Roy Huggins & John Pogue	Roy Huggins & John Pogue	Anne Kopelson and Arnold Kopelson
Untitled remake	TBA	Albert Hughes	Brian Tucker	Brian Tucker	Erik Feig

=== The Fugitive (1993) ===
After Dr. Richard Kimble is framed and convicted of the murder of his beloved wife, he must outrun the law and solve the mystery by locating her killer and clearing his name. In pursuit of Dr. Kimble is a team of U.S. Marshals under the direction of the determined detective, chief deputy US Marshal Samuel Gerard who will not stop until he catches the fugitive. Following in chase, Kimble works tirelessly to stay one step ahead of Gerard and his team with hopes of disproving the overwhelming evidence that wrongfully indicates that he is guilty. As he strives to find the identity of his wife's killer, he begins to uncover other secrets surrounding the planned murder before it is too late.

=== U.S. Marshals (1998) ===
When an airplane full of convicted felons crashes, a federal prisoner named Mark Sheridan who is wrongfully convicted of a double-murder escapes. Running from the law in search of proof that he is innocent, chief deputy U.S. Marshal Sam Gerard once again leads a team who are tasked with apprehending the escapee. Alongside State Department agent John Royce, Gerard finds himself once again following the trail of a fugitive of the law. As Mark frantically searches for the truth to exonerate his name, Gerard begins to question his guilt and finds evidences that indicate the innocence of members of his team may be in question.

=== Remake ===
A remake of The Fugitive is in development since 2019. Albert Hughes was attached as director, with a script from Brian Tucker which will reportedly put a new spin on the premise. Erik Feig was hired to produce the project. Warner Bros. Pictures will produce and distribute the film.

== Television ==
Series	Season(s)	Episode(s)	Originally released			Showrunner	Executive producer(s)	Status
Series	Season(s)	Episode(s)	First released	Last released	Network	Showrunner	Executive producer(s)	Status
The Fugitive (1963–1967)	4	120	September 17, 1963	August 29, 1967	American Broadcasting Company	Roy Huggins	Quinn Martin	Ended
The Fugitive (2000–2001)	1	22	October 6, 2000	May 25, 2001	CBS	Roy Huggins	Roy Huggins, John McNamara, Arnold Kopelson, Anne Kopelson, R. W. Goodwin	Cancelled
The Fugitive (2020)	1	14	August 3, 2020	August 18, 2020	Quibi, The Roku Channel	Nick Santora	Basil Iwanyk, Nick Santora, Stephen Hopkins, Tom Lassally, Albert Torres	Ended

=== The Fugitive (1963–1967) ===
Created by Roy Huggins for the American Broadcasting Company (ABC), as a collaboration between QM Productions and United Artists Television, the series debuted on September 17, 1963 and lasted until August 29, 1967. Consisting of four seasons, the show starred David Janssen as Dr. Richard Kimble, Barry Morse as Lt. Philip Gerard, and Bill Raisch as the killer referred to as the "One-Armed Man". Altogether, the series is largely regarded as a crime-drama classic.

Centering around Dr. Kimble, who is on the run from the law which has wrongfully convicted him of his wife's murder, the plot details his attempts to evade police lieutenant Philip Gerard, as he seeks to prove his innocence and find the killer. The popularity of the series eventually lead to the development of additional contemporary adaptations, years later.

=== The Fugitive (2000–2001) ===
Following the continued popularity and positive reception of the original show, as well as the financial and critical success of the titular film, Warner Bros. Entertainment and producer Arnold Kopelson developed a new adaptation of the story for CBS. Starring Tim Daly as Dr. Richard Kimble, Mykelti Williamson as Lt. Philip Gerard, and Stephen Lang as Ben Charnquist / the One-Armed Man, the series was met with acclaim from studio executives and positive reception from its audience upon its air date. Created by Warner Bros. Television in collaboration with Kopelson Entertainment, Kopelson Telemedia, and McNamara Paper Products, the series aired from October 6, 2000 until May 25, 2001, lasting one season which ended with a cliff-hanger, before its cancellation.

=== The Fugitive (2020) ===
Created by Nick Santora for a contemporary adaptation, with similar plot details to the original premise, albeit different characters and events, the series was initially developed as a streaming short-form series, exclusive for Quibi. In 2021, Roku purchased the library initially created for Quibi, and the company began to launch the content on their streaming service The Roku Channel as Roku Originals. Starring Boyd Holbrook as Mike Ferro and Kiefer Sutherland as Det. Clay Bryce, the series centers around Ferro as a man framed and falsely accused for a terrorist attack he did not commit, and his personal race against time in solving the crime.

The series aired from August 3–18, 2020 and was met with underwhelming reception, comparing it as inferior to its predecessors and only lasted one season.

== Main cast and characters ==
List indicator

This section includes characters who will appear or have appeared in the franchise in main roles.

- An empty grey cell indicates the character was not in the film, or that the character's official presence has not yet been confirmed.

Character	Film			Television series		
Character	The Fugitive	U.S. Marshals	Untitled remake	The Fugitive (1963–1967)	The Fugitive (2000–2001)	The Fugitive (2020)
Dr. Richard Kimble	Harrison Ford	mentioned		David Janssen	Tim Daly	
Chf. Dep. USMS Samuel Gerard	Tommy Lee Jones	Tommy Lee Jones				
Helen Kimble	Sela Ward					
Fredrick Sykes	Andreas Katsulas					
Dr. Charles Nichols	Jeroen Krabbé					
Mark J. Sheridan		Wesley Snipes				
DSS SA John Royce		Robert Downey Jr.				
Lt. Philip Gerard				Barry Morse	Mykelti Williamson	
Mike Ferro						Boyd Holbrook
Det. Clay Bryce						Kiefer Sutherland

== Additional crew and production details ==
Title	Crew/Detail					
Title	Composer	Cinematographer(s)	Editor(s)	Production companies	Distributing companies	Running time
The Fugitive (1963–1967)	Peter Rugolo	Meredith M. Nicholson, Robert Hoffman, Fred Mandl, Lloyd Ahern Sr., Carl E. Guthrie & George J. Folsey	Marston Fay, Robert L. Swanson, Walter Hannemann, Jerry Young, James Ballas, Richard Cahoon, Jodie Capelan, John Post, Larry Heath, and James E. Newcom	QM Productions, United Artists Television Inc.	United Artists Television, American Broadcasting Company	102 hours (51 minutes/episode)
The Fugitive	James Newton Howard	Michael Chapman	Don Brochu, David Finfer, Dean Goodhill, Dov Hoenig, Richard Nord & Dennis Virkler	Warner Bros., Keith Barish/Arnold Kopelson Productions	Warner Bros. Pictures: a Time Warner Entertainment Company	2 hours 10 minutes
U.S. Marshals	Jerry Goldsmith	Andrzej Bartkowiak	Terry Rawlings	Warner Bros., Kopelson Entertainment	Warner Bros. Pictures	2 hours 11 minutes
The Fugitive (2000–2001)	Louis Febre	Jon Joffin & Clark Mathis	Scott K. Wallace, David Ekstrom, James Coblentz, Casey O. Rohrs, and Robert A. Ferretti	Warner Bros. Television, Kopelson Entertainment, Kopelson Telemedia, McNamara Paper Products	Warner Bros. Television Distribution, Columbia Broadcasting System	22 hours (1 hour/episode)
The Fugitive (2020)	Tony Morales	Peter Levy	Eric Seaburn, and Christopher Petrus	Warner Bros. Television Studios, BlackJack Films, 3 Arts Entertainment, Thunder Road Films, Quibi Originals, Roku Originals	Warner Bros. Television Distribution, Quibi, The Roku Channel	84 minutes (9 minutes/episode)
Untitled reboot	TBA	TBA	TBA	Warner Bros. Pictures		TBA

== Reception ==
=== Box office and financial performance ===
Film	Box office gross			Box office ranking		Budget	Total world-wide net income	Ref.
Film	North America	Other territories	Worldwide	All time North America	All time worldwide	Budget	Total world-wide net income	Ref.
The Fugitive	$183,875,760	$169,839,557	$353,715,317	#266	#604	$44,000,000	$309,715,317	
U.S. Marshals	$57,833,603	$45,200,000	$103,033,603	#1,545	#2,710	$60,000,000	$43,033,603	
Totals	$241,709,363	$215,039,557	$456,748,920	x̄ #906	x̄ #1,657	$104,000,000	$352,748,920	

=== Critical and public response ===
Critical and public response of The Fugitive films
Title	Critical		Public
Title	Rotten Tomatoes	Metacritic	CinemaScore
The Fugitive (1963–1967)	—N/a	—N/a	—N/a
The Fugitive (1993)	96% (81 reviews)	87 (32 reviews)	A+
U.S. Marshals	30% (43 reviews)	47 (20 reviews)	A−
The Fugitive (2000–2001)	—N/a	69 (24 reviews)	—N/a
The Fugitive (2020)	20% (10 reviews)	—N/a	—N/a
