= The Fugitive (2000 TV series) =

American drama TV series, remake of 1963 series

- Genre: Action; Adventure; Mystery; Drama; Thriller
- Based on: The Fugitive by Roy Huggins
- Starring: Tim Daly; Mykelti Williamson
- Theme music composer: Louis Febre
- Country of origin: United States
- No. of seasons: 1
- No. of episodes: 22

Production
- Executive producers: Roy Huggins; John McNamara; R.W. Goodwin; Anne Kopelson; Arnold Kopelson
- Producer: Vladimir Stefoff
- Running time: 60 minutes
- Production companies: Kopelson Entertainment (episodes 1–4); Kopelson Telemedia (episodes 5–22); McNamara Paper Products; Warner Bros. Television

Original release
- Network: CBS
- Release: October 6, 2000 – May 25, 2001

The Fugitive is an American action drama television series that aired on CBS from October 6, 2000, to May 25, 2001. The series featured Tim Daly as Richard Kimble, Mykelti Williamson as Gerard, and Stephen Lang as the one-armed man. The show serves as a remake of the 1963 series of the same name and is the fourth release from The Fugitive franchise.

== Plot ==
Dr. Richard Kimble (Tim Daly) was wrongly convicted for the murder of his wife. He escapes from custody and changes his identity and toils at many jobs to search for a one-armed man (Stephen Lang) he saw leave the scene of the crime. He is relentlessly pursued by Lieutenant Gerard (Mykelti Williamson) obsessed with his capture.

== Cast ==
=== Main ===
- Tim Daly as Dr. Richard Kimble
- Mykelti Williamson as Lt. Philip Gerard

=== Recurring ===
- Stephen Lang as Ben Charnquist
- Kelly Rutherford as Helen Ross-Kimble
- Connie Britton as Maggie Kimble Hume
- Lia Johnson as Lenore Gerard
- Rex Linn as Karl Vasick
- John Aylward as Matthew Ross
- Janet Gunn as Becca Ross
- Bob Morrisey as Captain McLaren
- Lauren Tewes as Linda Westershulte

== Production ==
=== Development ===
The long-lasting success of the original series of The Fugitive combined with the huge success of 1993 film led to the development of this series. The influence of the movie is evident, particularly in some scenes of the pilot episode. The series was produced by Arnold Kopelson and Warner Bros., the producers of the 1993 film.

The pilot was directed by Mikael Salomon, and cost an estimated $6 million to film. According to Tim Daly, there were 3,500 affiliates at the CBS Affiliates Dinner in Las Vegas in 2000, they were shown the entire pilot of The Fugitive, and it got a seven-minute standing ovation.

=== Filming ===
The series was primarily filmed in areas around Seattle and neighboring Everett, Washington, with production based out of a warehouse in Mukilteo, Washington.

=== Connections to the original series ===
Each episode of the new series includes a credit "Created by Roy Huggins". Tim Daly's father James Daly made two guest appearances on the original series. Writer Arthur Weiss is credited with one episode of the new series and three of the old series. Lou Antonio, who appeared as an actor in three episodes of the original series, directed an episode of the new series. William Graham directed two episodes of the new series, and seven of the old series.

=== Cancellation ===
CBS cancelled the series after one season, leaving a cliffhanger unresolved.

== Episodes ==
No.	Title	Directed by	Written by	Original release date
1	"Pilot"	Mikael Salomon	John McNamara	October 6, 2000
Forced to flee, Dr. Richard Kimble pursues the only man who can prove his innocence, the One-Armed Man. Lt. Gerard tracks Kimble to Miami, where Kimble has innocently become entangled in a construction scheme that could cost someone their life, and Kimble the chance to bring his wife's killer to justice.
2	"The Hand of a Stranger"	Mikeal Salomon	John McNamara	October 13, 2000
Kimble tracks the one-armed man, Fred Johnson, to Savannah, Ga., where all of his money is stolen by a man, Garrett Davis, desperate to help his wife who has Parkinson disease, but he and Kimble find a way to help each other. In the meantime, Lt. Gerard has flashback of his wife's accident in which she died. Kimble is forced to fight for his life again when he confronts the one-armed man in his hotel room.
3	"Guilt"	Jeff Bleckner	John McNamara	October 20, 2000
Dr. Kimble, now in Manchester, South Carolina, assumes the identity of Raymond Lee Pettiford and gets a job at a bar. In his first day at his new work, a group of high school boys walk in asking for liquor. Kimble says no and everything ends up in a fight. One of the boys is Zach Lardner, the sheriff's son. The sheriff is doubtful about who actually started the fight and is suspicious about Jesse, the other bartender who came from Detroit after 18 months in prison. In an attempt to get back at Jesse, Zach and a friend steal the waitress's car to blame Jesse for it so he can go to back to jail. But Zach speeds too much getting a cop after him. They speed up and the officer crashes and dies... Meanwhile, Gerard is trying to get some evidence that might lead him to the one-armed man...
4	"Far from Home"	Richard Compton	John McNamara	October 27, 2000
Now in Charleston, South Carolina, Kimble is still after the man who murdered his wife. This time, Kimble got a job at a hotel using his fake ID (Ray Petterford). He meets a pregnant woman named Mia while doing his laundry and accidentally finds her wallet. Trying to be a good person, Kimble calls her house and tells her husband he found it. Her husband goes to the hotel after Kimble, thinking his wife is sleeping with him. After making a scene, Kimble realizes that he has to save Mia from her abusive husband and runs away with her...
5	"DrRichardKimble.com"	James Frawley	Kim Newton	November 3, 2000
While trying to hide from local police in Myrtle Beach, S.C., Kimble meets Chuck Brixius, an ultra-shy computer nerd who has developed an intricate website dedicated to proving Kimble's innocence. On the run, Kimble's physical condition worsens and he begins seeing beautiful visions of Helen, his beloved deceased wife. Defenceless, Kimble must muster the strength to go on, as Lt. Gerard quickly closes in.
6	"Miles to Go"	Thomas J. Wright	Valarie & Vivian Mayhew	November 10, 2000
Kimble gets a job working for a logging company while trying to track down the one-armed man in Northern Maine. During a freak accident a man is tragically killed and the person responsible for it flees from the scene of the crime and takes Kimble as a hostage.
7	"St. Christopher's Prayer"	Robert Singer	Matthew Carnahan & Arthur Weiss	November 17, 2000
Knowing Gerard is watching, Kimble risks his freedom in order to see his terminally ill father one last time. However, Gerard is one step ahead of Kimble and stakes out the house, prepared to finally catch his man.
8	"Sanctuary"	Bill L. Norton	David Ehrman	November 24, 2000
While in Pennsylvania, Kimble hides out with an ex whose boyfriend discovers the arrangement and inadvertently passes the information to a bounty hunter hired by Kimble's father-in-law.
9	"Liar's Poker"	Richard Compton	Randy Anderson	December 8, 2000
In Atlantic City, Kimble meets a down-on-his-luck gambler, who unwittingly puts Kimble in danger with a loan shark and Vasick the bounty hunter hired by Kimble's father-in-law.
10	"Lagniappe"	Lou Antonio	Sharon Lee Watson	January 5, 2001
Kimble is in New Orleans after evidence that the one-armed man is not dead. He tries to pass as his brother to obtain medical records of his death, but two hospital workers catch him using a fake id. In order to obtain the files, he now has to pay them bribery. Kimble reconsiders an offer to work at an illegal clinic on the back of a herbal medicine store. There he is able to show his medical skills, and soon develop a romantic environment with the clinic's "doctor", Nettie..
11	"New Orleans Saints"	Mel Damski	Kim Newton	January 12, 2001
Kimble comes upon the piteous Renee while rescuing her from an apparent mugging in New Orleans. Renee thinks her husband is dead, and Kimble learns that her assailant was an insurance investigator looking into the $100,000 settlement she collected. Kimble comes clean about who he is, but when the one-armed man returns to town, the motives of everyone become clear.
12	"Safekeeping"	Alan J. Levi	Lisa Melamed	January 26, 2001
Kimble's peaceful life with Nathan, a kindly farmer in Topeka, Kan., and his daughter, Mallory, is disrupted when Mallory's mother, a recovering alcoholic, returns to reclaim her family. Meanwhile, Vasick taps the phone of Kimble's lawyer, tipping him off to Kimble's location. Gerard, who as a result of his Internal Affairs investigation learns of this, must get to Kimble ahead of Vasick.
13	"And in That Darkness"	R.W. Goodwin	John McNamara & Sharon Lee Watson	February 2, 2001
Now in Memphis, Tennessee, Kimble is taken away by the police while sleeping on a public bench. He's admitted into a psychiatric institution, where he's diagnosed as schizophrenic. While planning on how to escape from the clinic he meets Grace, a former pianist who's suffering from depression. Kimble sees the true causes of her illness and modifies her medication prescription in order to help her come back to her normal mental status...
14	"Past Perfect"	James Frawley	Randy Anderson	February 9, 2001
In Aurora, Illinois, with the help of the new task force, Gerard discovers that Kimble has been communicating with his old prison cellmate, Steve, and his mother, Delores via the USA Today personal ads. Unaware that Steve and Delores are the same people who helped Kimble elude Illinois police blockades and Gerard's clutches months earlier, Gerard plants misleading information about the one-armed man in Steve's prison, knowing that Steve will get his mother to alert the fugitive. As Gerard waits for the man he's desperately hunted for almost a year, an unknowing Kimble heads right for the trap.
15	"Jenny"	Philip Sgriccia	John McNamara & Kim Newton	February 16, 2001
Kimble breaks into an ostensibly closed-down inn in Cliffside, California, to hide and unexpectedly meets Jenny Butler (guest star Stacy Edwards, Chicago Hope), the beautiful owner. After they both reveal that they have recently lost loved ones, Jenny hires Kimble to do some repairs. As the friendship between Jenny and Kimble grows into something more romantic, the Hennesseys, a ruthless bank-robbing couple on the run, plot to use Kimble's identity to their advantage.
16	"Strapped"	Winrich Kolbe	Matthew Carnahan	February 23, 2001
After taking Jenny hostage, bank-robbers Donny and Lynnette Hennessy force Kimble to help them rob a local bank. However, due to the Hennesseys' infamous record, Gerard gets wind of Kimble's involvement with the scheming duo. Now, as Kimble runs out of time to save Jenny while he tries to elude Gerard, he must also decide whether or not he and Jenny can actually have a future together.
17	"Sea Change"	James Whitmore Jr.	David Ehrman	March 30, 2001
Dr. Kimble tracks down the one-armed man in San Francisco but now must try to save his enemy's life.
18	"Tucker's Gift"	Chris Long	Randy Anderson	April 6, 2001
Kimble helps a dying man fulfil his final wish.
19	"Flesh and Blood"	William Graham	Lisa Melamed	April 13, 2001
Dr. Kimble learns his sister Maggie has Leukemia he contacts his friend Dr. Diana Thayer to find out if he is a match for a bone-marrow transplant.
20	"Smith 282"	William Graham	Valerie & Vivian Mayhew	April 20, 2001
Becca Ross, Helen Kimble's sister, confesses to Richard that she received e-mails from a man who claims to have witnessed Helen's murder. Kimble decides to help a woman at a busy Boston street corner, fearing that she is being followed...
21	"Götterdämmerung"	Winrich Kolbe	Kim Newton	May 25, 2001
Helen's inheritance money is finally available and her sister hires a very expensive (but very good) lawyer to take Richard's case. They plan on sending Richard to Switzerland to live there while the case unfolds. Richard gets a fake passport, but just as Becca is wiring money to an account in Zurique, she is arrested by Gerard and her accounts are frozen. Gerard puts police officers in several airports looking for Kimble. Meanwhile, the one-armed man gets irritated once he sees his picture in an article on the newspaper about Kimble's case. The one-armed man goes after Richard's nephew and gives him a note saying that if Richard doesn't turn himself in, he'll kill the boy.
22	"Thanatos"	R.W. Goodwin	Matthew Carnahan & John McNamara	May 25, 2001
Kimble finally turns the tables on the one-armed man, taking him hostage with plans to deliver him to Gerard, but an FBI agent (Dennis Boutsikaris) and complications along the way threaten the doctor's last chance at freedom. The episode and the series ends with an unresolved cliffhanger as the agent kills Gerard and corners Kimble and the one-armed man, shooting one of them dead.

== Broadcast ==
The show was the first lead-in to CSI: Crime Scene Investigation on Friday nights, which became a hit when it debuted the same year.

Reruns of the series have previously aired on HDNet and AOL's streaming service, In2TV.

In Italy it aired on Rete 4 with reruns on Italia 1 and Duel TV.

== Reception ==
=== Critical reception ===
The Fugitive received praise for Tim Daly's performance as doctor Richard Kimble. The pilot also received praise for its sound editing.

=== Awards ===
Year	Association	Category	Nominated artist/work	Result	Ref.
2001	Primetime Emmy Award	Outstanding Sound Editing for a Series	Michael E. Lawshe (supervising sound editor), Timothy A. Cleveland (sound effects editor), Rick Camera (sound effects editor), Otis Van Osten (sound effects editor), David M. Horton (sound effects editor), Bruce M. Honda (dialogue editor), Jessica Goodwin (dialogue editor), Eric Hertsguaard (dialogue editor), Nancie Araki (dialogue editor), Chris McGeary (music editor), Casey J. Crabtree (Foley artist), Michael Crabtree (Foley artist). For the pilot.	Nominated	
2001	7th Screen Actors Guild Awards	Outstanding Performance by a Male Actor in a Drama Series	Tim Daly	Nominated	
2001	Motion Picture Sound Editors, USA	Best Sound Editing - Television Episodic - Effects & Foley	Michael E. Lawshe (supervising sound editor), Rick Camera (sound editor), Timothy A. Cleveland (sound editor), David M. Horton (sound editor), David Werntz (sound editor), Darren Wright (sound editor), Otis Van Osten (sound editor). For the pilot.	Won	
2001	5th Golden Satellite Awards	Best Performance by an Actor in a Series, Drama	Tim Daly	Won	
2001	5th Golden Satellite Awards	Best Television Series, Drama	The Fugitive	Nominated	
2001	TV Guide Award	Actor of the Year in a New Series	Tim Daly	Nominated	
