= Tom Wood (actor) =

American actor

Thomas Mills Wood
- Born: April 19, 1963 (age 63); Long Beach, California, U.S.
- Occupation: Actor
- Years active: 1988–2000

Thomas Mills Wood (born April 19, 1963) is an American actor. He is known for his portrayal of police characters, especially Deputy Marshal Noah Newman in the 1993 film The Fugitive and its spinoff, the 1998 film U.S. Marshals.

== Early life ==
Wood was born on April 19, 1963, in Long Beach, California, the son of Donna Wood, a finance professional, and Thomas Mills Wood, Sr., a variety performer and accountant.

== Career ==
Beginning in 1988, Wood appeared in numerous television shows and over ten films including Ulee's Gold, Apollo 13, Under Siege, and Avalon. He worked for a variety of film directors including Andrew Davis, Ron Howard, Barry Levinson, Nora Ephron, and Victor Nuñez.

On Broadway, Wood starred with Jason Robards and Christopher Plummer in Harold Pinter's four-character No Man's Land and performed in off-Broadway productions starring opposite such actors as Laura Dern, Oliver Platt, and Kyle MacLachlan.
