= Johnny Lee Davenport =

American actor (1950–2020)

- Born: July 24, 1950; Shreveport, Louisiana, U.S.
- Died: February 2, 2020 (aged 69); Boston, Massachusetts, U.S.
- Occupation: Actor

Johnny Lee Davenport (July 24, 1950 – February 2, 2020) was an American actor, known for his role as Marshal Henry in 1993's The Fugitive, a role he reprised in 1998's U.S. Marshals.

== Early life ==
Davenport was born in Shreveport, Louisiana and grew up in Aurora, Illinois. There, he attended West Aurora High School, where he was cast in the school's production of the musical Carousel . As a student at Southern Illinois University Carbondale, he helped start that school's acting company.

== Death ==
He died on February 2, 2020, from leukemia.

== Film ==
| Year | Title | Role | Notes |
|---|---|---|---|
| 1989 | The Package | MP | |
| 1993 | The Fugitive | Deputy Marshal Henry | |
| 1996 | Chain Reaction | Caleb Williams | |
| 1998 | U.S. Marshals | Deputy Marshal Henry | |
| 2010 | Locked In | Jim Sanders | |
| 2012 | Ted | Husband | |
| 2013 | Time and Charges | Boreas Victorious | |
| 2015 | Joy | Ray Cagney | |
| 2016 | The Ascendants Anthology | The Guide, Sebastian | |

== Shakespeare ==
After being cast as Antonio in the Stratford Festival of Canada's production of Twelfth Night in 1988, Davenport made the plays of Shakespeare a major part of his acting repertoire. The following year he became a member of the theater group Shakespeare & Company in Lenox, Massachusetts, and went to perform with the company 16 seasons. His credits in that venue include Bottom in A Midsummer Night's Dream, As You Like It, Twelfth Night, Henry IV, Parts 1 & 2, Richard II, the title role in Othello, A Winter's Tale, Measure for Measure, Richard III, Hamlet, and Henry V.

== Other stage roles ==
During the 1990s he performed frequently in Chicago venues, including the Steppenwolf, Court, and Goodman Theaters. Plays in which he appeared include Miss Julie, Cry, the Beloved Country, and Comedians. He also appeared as Chris, the father of Anna Christie in "Anna Christie" by Eugene O'Neill at the Lyric Stage Company of Boston (April 6-May 6, 2018).

== Awards and nominations ==
| Year | Award | Category | Work | Result |
|---|---|---|---|---|
| 2008 | Elliot Norton Award | Outstanding Actor, Small/Midsize Company | A House With No Walls | Nominated |
| 2008 | Elliot Norton Award | Outstanding Actor, Small/Midsize Company | Love's Labour's Lost | Nominated |
| 2011 | Elliot Norton Award | Outstanding Actor, Midsize Theater | Broke-ology | Won |
| 2011 | IRNE Award | Best Supporting Actor (play), Large Theater | Vengeance is the Lord's | Nominated |
| 2012 | IRNE Award | Best Actor (Play), Small Theater | Broke-ology | Nominated |
| 2013 | IRNE Award | Best Actor (Play), Small Theater | "Master Harold"...and the Boys | Nominated |
| 2014 | Elliot Norton Award | Best Actor (Play), Midsize Theater | Driving Miss Daisy | Won |
| 2014 | IRNE Award | Best Supporting Actor (play), Large Theater | Invisible Man | Nominated |
| 2015 | Elliot Norton Award | Best Actor (Play), Midsize Theater | The Whipping Man | Nominated |
| 2016 | IRNE Award | Best Actor (Play), Midsize Theater | Beowulf | Nominated |
| 2017 | IRNE Award | Best Supporting Actor (Play), Midsize Theater | Bootycandy | Nominated |
| 2018 | IRNE Award | Best Solo Performance, Small Theater | Thurgood | Nominated |
| 2019 | IRNE Award | Best Supporting Actor (Play), Small Theater | Thurgood | Nominated |

Davenport was named Best Actor in Boston Magazine for his body of work during the 2010–2011 season and was a recipient of Washington, D.C.'s Helen Hayes Award.
