= U.S. Marshals (film) =

1998 film by Stuart Baird

- Theatrical release poster
- Directed by: Stuart Baird
- Written by: John Pogue
- Based on: Characters by: Roy Huggins
- Produced by: Anne Kopelson; Arnold Kopelson
- Starring: Tommy Lee Jones; Wesley Snipes; Robert Downey Jr.; Joe Pantoliano; Kate Nelligan; Irène Jacob
- Cinematography: Andrzej Bartkowiak
- Edited by: Terry Rawlings
- Music by: Jerry Goldsmith
- Production company: Kopelson Entertainment
- Distributed by: Warner Bros.
- Release date: March 6, 1998
- Running time: 131 minutes
- Country: United States
- Language: English
- Budget: $45 million
- Box office: $102.4 million

U.S. Marshals is a 1998 American crime action film directed by Stuart Baird and written by John Pogue. The film is a sequel to The Fugitive (1993). It centers on United States Deputy Marshal Sam Gerard, once again played by Tommy Lee Jones. The plot follows Gerard and his team as they pursue another fugitive, Mark Sheridan, played by Wesley Snipes, who attempts to escape government officials following an international conspiracy scandal. The film cast features Robert Downey Jr., Joe Pantoliano, Daniel Roebuck, Tom Wood, and LaTanya Richardson, several of whom portrayed deputy marshals in the previous film.

The film was a co-production of Warner Bros. Pictures and Kopelson Entertainment. The score was composed by Jerry Goldsmith.

U.S. Marshals premiered in theaters in the United States on March 6, 1998, grossing a worldwide total of $102.4 million against a budget of $45 million. It received mixed reviews.

== Plot ==
In New York City, two Diplomatic Security Service (DSS) Special Agents are killed during a briefcase exchange in a United Nations (UN) parking garage. The murders are caught on a security camera, but the killer escapes with top-secret files. Several months later, Senior Deputy US Marshal Samuel Gerard and his team capture a pair of fugitives in Chicago. Elsewhere in the city, tow truck driver Mark Warren is injured in an auto accident and arrested for possession of an illegal handgun, but a fingerprint check reveals he is federal fugitive Mark Roberts, wanted for the double homicide in New York. Aboard a prisoner transport flight with Gerard, Roberts thwarts an assassination attempt by a prisoner with an improvised firearm, but the bullet shoots a massive hole in the plane, blowing the would-be-assassin out one of the windows to his death. The plane crashes into the Ohio River, and Gerard tries to rescue the surviving prisoners as Roberts escapes.

DSS Special Agent John Royce is assigned to join Gerard's team in the hunt for Roberts, whom they corner in a Kentucky swamp before he wounds Gerard and retreats. Gerard suspects that Royce is concealing information about Roberts and the murders, while Roberts calls his girlfriend Marie Bineaux, explaining that he was a government agent until he was betrayed in New York. Returning to Manhattan, Roberts secures supplies from a Force Recon comrade and surveils Chinese diplomat Xiang Chen. Gerard's team interrogates Marie and tracks down the mechanic hired to conceal the zip gun for the Chinese assassin on the plane but find him dead, murdered by Chen.

Reviewing the parking garage security footage, Gerard discovers that Roberts' exchange with Chen was intercepted by the DSS agents and that Roberts acted in self-defense and was wearing gloves, despite the DSS's claim that he was identified by fingerprints. DSS Director Bertram Lamb admits to Gerard and his senior supervisor Catherine Walsh that Roberts is Mark Sheridan, a former CIA Special Activities Division Agent suspected of selling U.S. State Department classified intelligence to the Chinese government. Chen was delivering money to Sheridan for the information when the DSS agents tried to apprehend Sheridan, who escaped with the documents.

Gerard's team tracks Sheridan to a cemetery where he catches DSS Special Agent Frank Barrows collecting a delivery from Chen, forcing Barrows to admit to a larger conspiracy to frame Sheridan. Marie arrives as Chen shoots at Sheridan, killing Barrows instead. Deputy Marshals Savannah Cooper and Bobby Biggs apprehend Chen, while Cosmo Renfro and Royce intercept Sheridan, who is forced to leave Marie behind. Royce, Gerard, and Deputy Marshal Noah Newman pursue Sheridan into a nearby retirement home. Finding Royce preparing to execute Sheridan, Newman is shot by Royce; Sheridan flees to the roof, and Royce bluffs to Gerard that Sheridan shot Newman. Swinging onto a passing commuter train, Sheridan eludes safely, and Newman dies beside Gerard en route to the hospital.

Determined to kill Sheridan, a vengeful Gerard and Royce track him onto a freighter ship bound for Canada. During a struggle inside a grain container, Sheridan almost kills Gerard but relents, and Sheridan is critically shot by Royce. Gerard realizes that the gun used to shoot Newman was Royce's; Royce is the real mole in league with Chen and framed Sheridan. Left alone to guard Sheridan's hospital room, Royce wakes him up to murder him but is confronted by Gerard. When Royce pulls his gun from his waistband, Gerard draws his service weapon and shoots Royce dead. Sheridan is exonerated and reunites with Marie, while Gerard and his team depart to drink a toast to Newman.

== Cast ==
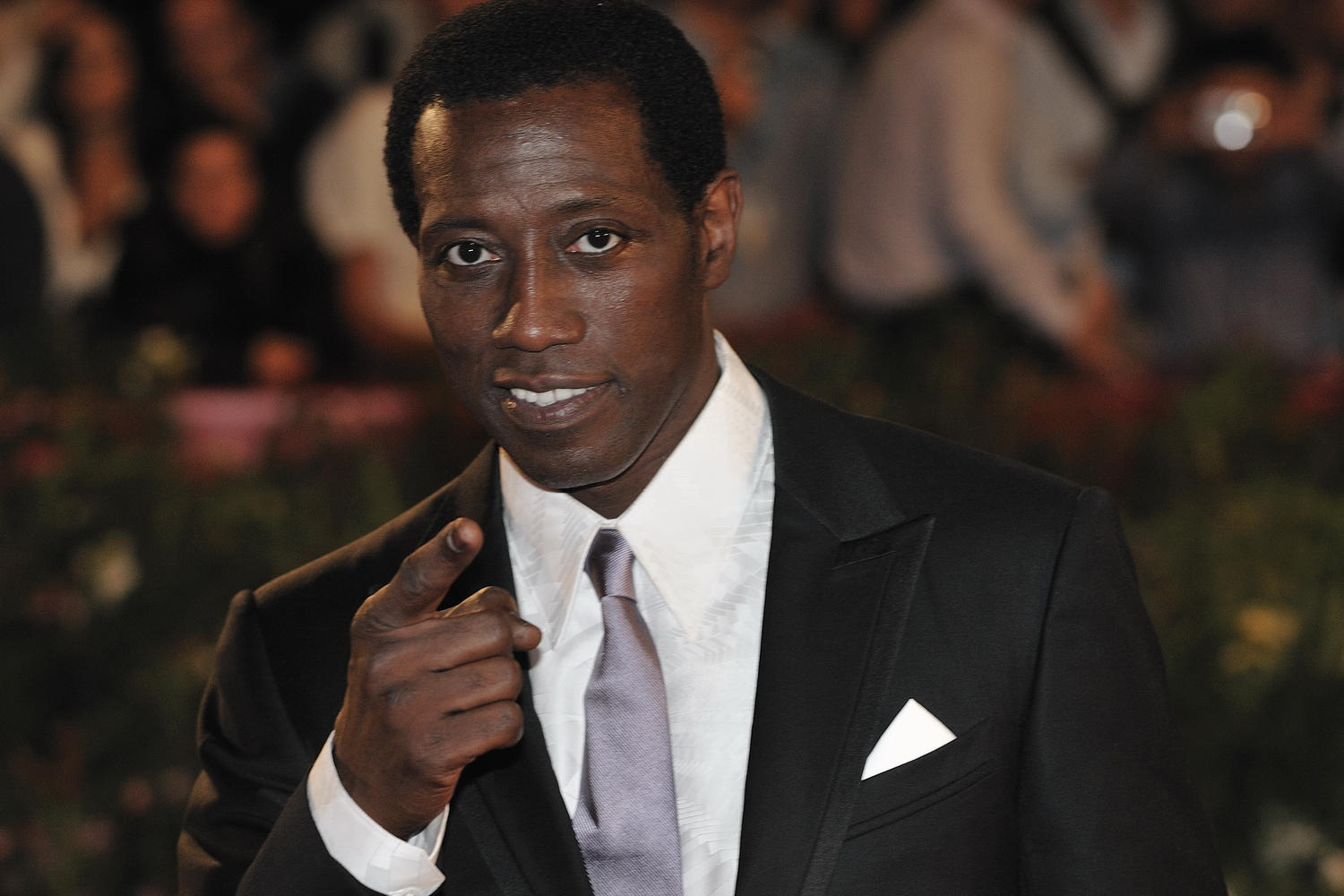
Wesley Snipes portrayed Mark Sheridan, a former CIA Special Activities Division operative and a former Force Recon Marine, who went rogue during an investigation to uncover a mole within the U.S. State Department

- Tommy Lee Jones as Chief Deputy U.S. Marshal Samuel Gerard
- Wesley Snipes as Mark J. Sheridan / Mark Roberts / Mark Warren
- Robert Downey Jr. as DSS Special Agent John Royce
- Joe Pantoliano as Deputy Cosmo Renfro
- Kate Nelligan as U.S. Marshal Catherine Walsh
- Daniel Roebuck as Deputy Bobby Biggs
- Tom Wood as Deputy Noah Newman
- LaTanya Richardson as Deputy Savannah Cooper
- Irène Jacob as Marie Bineaux
- Patrick Malahide as DSS Director Bertram Lamb
- Rick Snyder as DSS Special Agent Frank Barrows
- Michael Paul Chan as MSS Agent Xiang Chen
- Johnny Lee Davenport as Deputy Henry
- Donald Gibb as Michael Conroy

== Production ==
Following the success of The Fugitive, Warner Bros. Pictures began developing a follow-up film, with early drafts incorporating Harrison Ford's character Dr. Richard Kimble. However, these drafts ultimately failed to convince Ford to return. In October 1995, it was reported that Tommy Lee Jones was set to reprise his role as U.S. Marshal Sam Gerard in either a spin-off titled U.S. Marshals or a direct sequel, both of which were being written by John Pogue. In December 1996, it was reported that David Duchovny was being considered as a possible co-star on the film. In January 1997, Wesley Snipes was reportedly being considered for the role of the fugitive hunted by Gerard and his team after producers were impressed with his performance in Murder at 1600.

=== Filming ===
Filming locations included Metropolis, Bay City, Shawneetown, and Chicago in Illinois, as well as New York City, Benton, Kentucky, and Reelfoot Lake (Walnut Log) in Obion County, Tennessee.

== Music ==
U.S. Marshals: Original Motion Picture Soundtrack

Film score by Jerry Goldsmith
- Released: March 10, 1998
- Length: 29:44
- Label: Varèse Sarabande

The original motion picture soundtrack for U.S. Marshals was released by the Varèse Sarabande music label on March 3, 1998. The score for the film was composed and conducted by Jerry Goldsmith and mixed by Bruce Botnick. Kenneth Hall edited the film's music.

== Release ==
=== Home media ===
Following its cinematic release, the Region 1 Code widescreen edition of the film was released on DVD in the U.S. on July 21, 1998. Special features for the DVD include: interactive behind-the-scenes documentary – Anatomy of the Plane Crash; historical documentary – Justice Under the Star; feature-length commentary by director Stuart Baird; interactive menus; production notes; two theatrical trailers; three TV spots; and scene access. Additionally, a Special Edition repackaged DVD was also released on November 3, 2009. Special features include: a closed caption option; interactive behind-the-scenes documentary – Anatomy of the Plane Crash; historical documentary – Justice Under the Star; feature length commentary by director Stuart Baird; two theatrical trailers; and three TV spots.

A VHS format version of the film was released on February 2, 1999. A restored widescreen hi-definition Blu-ray Disc version of the film was released on June 5, 2012. Special features include: two documentaries – Anatomy of the plane crash and Justice Under the Star; commentary by director Stuart Baird; and the theatrical trailer. The film has been made available in Video on demand as well.

== Reception ==
=== Box office ===
U.S. Marshals premiered in cinemas on March 6, 1998, in wide release throughout the United States. During that weekend, the film opened in second place, grossing $16,863,988 at 2,817 locations. The film Titanic was in first place during that weekend, with $17,605,849 in revenue. The film's revenue dropped by 32% in its second week of release, earning $11,355,259. For that particular weekend, the film fell to 3rd place with the same theater count. The continuing success of Titanic remained unchallenged in first place with $17,578,815 in box office business. During its final week in release, U.S. Marshals was in 60th place, grossing a marginal $16,828 in revenue. U.S. Marshals went on to top out domestically at $57,167,405 in total ticket sales through its theatrical run. For 1998 as a whole, the film would cumulatively rank at a box office performance position of 36.

=== Critical response ===
The film received mixed reviews. Rotten Tomatoes gave the film a score of 31% based on reviews from 43 critics, with an average score of 4.9 out of 10. The site's consensus states: "A rote albeit well-cast action thriller, U.S. Marshals suffers badly in comparison to the beloved blockbuster that preceded it." At Metacritic, which assigns a weighted average out of 100 to critics' reviews, U.S. Marshals was given a score of 47 based on 20 reviews. Audiences polled by CinemaScore gave the film an average grade of "A−" on an A+ to F scale.

The result is unconvincing and disorganized. Yes, there are some spectacular stunts and slick special effects sequences. Yes, Jones is right on the money, and Snipes makes a sympathetic fugitive. But it's the story that has to pull this train, and its derailment is about as definitive as the train crash in the earlier film.

— Roger Ebert, writing for the Chicago Sun-Times

Barbara Shulgasser, writing in The San Francisco Examiner, was generally positive about the acting, saying, "The film's pacing is unimpeachable and good performances are delivered by Jones, Snipes, Irene Jacob as Sheridan's loyal girlfriend and, for brief moments, Kate Nelligan as Gerard's tough but lovable boss." Left impressed, Desson Howe in The Washington Post noted how "Every story beat is expertly planned and executed." Howe also praised director Baird, exclaiming how he "runs the show with a smart eye and a metronome ticking somewhere in his mind."

Writing for the Chicago Sun-Times, Roger Ebert, giving the film two and a half stars out of four, observed, "I didn't expect U.S. Marshals to be the equal of The Fugitive, and it isn't. But I hoped it would approach the taut tension of the 1993 film, and it doesn't. It has extra scenes, needless characters, an aimless plot and a solution that the hero seems to keep learning and then forgetting." Russell Smith of The Austin Chronicle bluntly declared that, "Unlike Kimble, whose innocence and decency are known from the beginning in The Fugitive, Sheridan is a total cipher to both Gerard and the audience until deep into this two-hours-plus film. Ergo, we can't be expected to give a rat's ass what happens to him – and don't." Owen Gleiberman of Entertainment Weekly opined that U.S. Marshals was "Lean, tense, and satisfyingly tricky." In a primarily negative review, Mick LaSalle, writing for the San Francisco Chronicle, called the film "a bad idea to begin with." He noted his confusion with the plot, remarking, "the movie tells us from the beginning that the fugitive is not quite innocent. He killed two fellow agents in self-defense. All this does is muddy the moral waters, making us queasy about the one guy we like. At no point is there ever a compelling reason to keep watching." James Berardinelli of ReelViews described Marshal Gerard as exhibiting "only a token resemblance to the character who doggedly pursued Kimble in The Fugitive. As re-invented here, Gerard is a generic action hero; most of the quirks that made him interesting (and that earned Jones an Oscar) are absent. With a few minor re-writes, John McClane from the Die Hard movies could have been plugged into this role."

Snipes is luckless in the part, which merely demands a lot of scowling, then moving aside to let the stunt double take over. (The movie's other big treat features that nameless individual, who leaps off a building and swings, as if on a bungee cord, to a nearby station roof, then races after the train pulling out and leaps to land upon its roof; that's fun, but it's no movie in itself.)

— Stephen Hunter, writing in The Washington Post

Dissatisfied with the film's quality, Jonathan Rosenbaum of the Chicago Reader said that it was "Not so much a sequel to The Fugitive as a lazy spin-off that imitates only what was boring and artificially frenetic about that earlier thriller; the little that kept it interesting—Tommy Lee Jones's Oscar-winning inflections, better-than-average direction—is nowhere in evidence." Stephen Hunter, writing for The Washington Post, reasoned, "It turns out to be one of those lame double-agent things where everybody's working for everybody else, the security of Taiwan (Taiwan!) is at stake, and it never quite lurches into clarity or acquires any real emotional punch. I didn't think the end of The Fugitive was so great either: Who wants to watch doctors fistfight on a roof? But by the time it winds down, U.S. Marshals has all but destroyed itself." Film critic Maitland McDonagh of TV Guide was not impressed with the sequel, writing, "To every hit there is a season, and a time for every sequel under heaven – no matter what narrative contortions it takes… The minute Gerard mocks Royce's 'nickel-plated sissy pistol,' it's clear they're headed for a cathartic showdown, and anyone who can't see which member of Gerard's merry band might as well be wearing a 'Dead Meat Walking' T-shirt really shouldn't be allowed to operate complicated machinery."

== Novelization ==
A novelization of the film, U.S. Marshals: A Novel, written by Max Allan Collins, was released on March 1, 1998.

== See also ==
- The Fugitive (1963 TV series)
- 1998 in film
