= The Fugitive (1963 TV series) =

American crime drama series (1963–1967)

- Genre: Crime; Drama
- Created by: Roy Huggins
- Starring: David Janssen; Barry Morse
- Narrated by: William Conrad; Dick Wesson (episode credits)
- Theme music composer: Peter Rugolo
- Country of origin: United States
- No. of seasons: 4
- No. of episodes: 120 (90 in black-and-white, 30 in color) (list of episodes)

Production
- Executive producer: Quinn Martin
- Producers: Alan Armer (1963–1966); Wilton Schiller (1966–1967)
- Running time: 51 minutes
- Production companies: Quinn Martin Productions; United Artists Television

Original release
- Network: ABC
- Release: September 17, 1963 – August 30, 1967

The Fugitive is an American crime drama television series created by Roy Huggins and produced by QM Productions and United Artists Television. It aired on ABC from September 17, 1963, to August 29, 1967. David Janssen starred as Dr. Richard Kimble, a physician who is wrongfully convicted of his wife's murder, and unjustly sentenced to death. While Dr. Kimble is en route to death row, the train derails over a track defect, allowing him to escape and begin a cross-country search for the real killer, a "one-armed man" (played by Bill Raisch). At the same time, Richard Kimble is hounded by the authorities, most notably by Police Lieutenant Philip Gerard (Barry Morse).

The Fugitive aired for four seasons, with 120 51-minute episodes produced. The first three seasons were filmed in black-and-white, while the fourth and final season was filmed in color.

The series was nominated for five Emmy Awards and won the Emmy for Outstanding Dramatic Series in 1966. In 2002, it was ranked number 36 on TV Guide's 50 Greatest TV Shows of All Time. TV Guide named the one-armed man number five in their 2013 list of the 60 Nastiest Villains of All Time.

The popularity of the series led to various adaptations and the creation of a titular franchise.

== Plot ==
The series premise was set up in the opening narration, but the full details about the crime were not offered in the pilot episode; at the time of the pilot, Richard Kimble has been on the run for six months, having exhausted all of his appeals against his death sentence. While in transit, the train carrying Richard Kimble derails, and becomes the titular "fugitive" attempting to clear his name. The premise (heard over footage of Kimble handcuffed to Gerard on a train) was summarized in the opening title sequence of the pilot episode as follows:

The name: Dr. Richard Kimble. The destination: Death Row, State Prison. The irony: Richard Kimble is innocent. Proved guilty, what Richard Kimble could not prove was that moments before discovering his murdered wife's body, he saw a one-armed man running from the vicinity of his home. Richard Kimble ponders his fate as he looks at the world for the last time, and sees only darkness. But in that darkness, Fate moves its huge hand.

Viewers were not offered the full details of Dr. Richard Kimble's plight until episode 14, "The Girl from Little Egypt". A series of flashbacks reveals the fateful night of Helen Kimble's death, and for the first time offers a glimpse of the "one-armed man".

== Cast and characters ==
=== Main characters ===
==== Dr. Richard Kimble ====
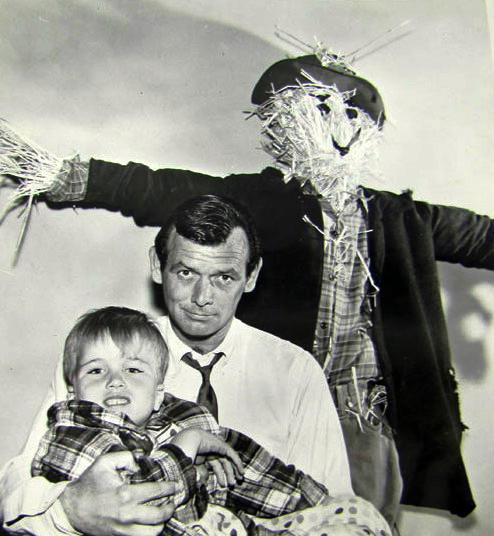
David Janssen as Richard Kimble with Clint Howard, 1965

The show's lead, and the only character seen in all 120 episodes, was Dr. Richard David Kimble (David Janssen).

Though Dr. Richard Kimble was a respected pediatrician in the fictional small town of Stafford, Indiana, he and his wife Helen Waverly Kimble were generally known to have been having arguments prior to her death. Helen's pregnancy had ended in a stillborn birth of a son, and surgery to save her life had also rendered her infertile. The couple was devastated, but Helen refused to consider adopting children as Richard wanted.

On the night of Helen's murder, the Kimbles had been heard, earlier the same day, arguing heatedly over this topic by their neighbors. Richard later went out for a drive to cool off; as he was driving home, he nearly hit a man with only one arm, who was fleeing from the vicinity of the Kimble house. Richard then found that Helen had been killed, but no one had seen or heard Richard go out for his drive, or seen him while he was out, and no evidence showed that the "one-armed man" whom Richard Kimble saw ever existed. At his trial, Richard Kimble was unjustly convicted of Helen's murder and sentenced to death (method of execution not specified).

After the train wreck and his escape from custody, Richard Kimble moves from town to town, always trying to remain unobtrusive and unnoticed as he evades capture and tries to find the one-armed man. He adopts many nondescript aliases, and toils at low-paying, menial jobs (i.e. those that require no identification or security checks, and bring about little social attention). In many episodes, he comes across a damsel in distress or possibly a child in danger; he then chooses to put his anonymity at risk by aiding this deserving person. Another frequent plot device is for someone to discover Richard Kimble's true identity and use it to manipulate him, under the threat of turning him in to the police.

Dr. Richard Kimble is smart and resourceful, and is usually able to perform well at any job he takes. (This sometimes leads to suspicion, as his educated demeanor is often very much at odds with the menial nature of the jobs he is forced to take.) He also displays considerable prowess in hand-to-hand combat. In the episode "Nemesis", he distracts, then knocks out, a forest ranger, then quickly unloads the man's rifle to ensure he cannot shoot him if pursued. In the sixth episode, Richard Kimble revealed that he had served as a doctor in the Korean War.

Richard Kimble's family makes scattered appearances throughout the series, most notably his sister, Donna (Jacqueline Scott) and her husband, Leonard Taft (played by James Sikking, Lin McCarthy and James Anderson in different episodes; Richard Anderson played Leonard Taft in the classic two-part final episode, "The Judgment"). Richard Kimble's family first appears in the 15th episode, "Home is the Hunted", wherein he returns to his hometown after reading in his hometown newspaper that his father, Dr. John Kimble (Robert Keith), is retiring. Also introduced is Richard Kimble's brother Ray (Andrew Prine). While Donna and John believed Richard Kimble's innocence, Ray was unconvinced and grew to resent Richard, as their association cost Ray his job and his fiancée; however, Ray becomes convinced of Richard's innocence during his stay. Also featuring are Leonard and Donna's sons, David (Bill Mumy) and Billy (Clint Howard); despite their appearance, though, only Billy (Johnny Jensen) appears in the series' two-part finale "The Judgment" (in part two, Donna mentions temporarily moving Billy in with his brother to accommodate a visitor). Although the whole family was introduced, only Donna and her family reappeared in subsequent episodes. Ray was not mentioned again in the show, and the third-season episode "Running Scared" dealt with Richard Kimble and his sister Donna reuniting to grieve over their father's death.

In "The Survivors", Richard Kimble re-establishes contact with Helen's family, the Waverlys, after learning that her father Ed (Lloyd Gough) is facing bankruptcy over medical bills for his wife Edith (Ruth White), who has developed a heart condition by obsessively clinging to Helen's memory and listening to phonograph records she made before her death. Richard Kimble visits the family and stays with them, despite Edith's objections, and with help from Helen's sister Terry (Louise Sorel) locates a secret bank account Helen kept for emergencies. He signs the account over to Ed, saving him financially, but his safety is compromised when Edith learns that Terry believes in his innocence (as does Ed, to a lesser extent) and is in love with Richard Kimble, and Edith threatens to report him to the police. Richard Kimble gently but firmly lets Terry down with a few well-chosen words that put an end to years of misguided thinking on Terry's part, and he soon leaves the house with Ed, who takes him to a remote bus stop where he can escape from the area.

David Janssen's understated, compelling, sensitive portrayal skillfully captured the essence of Dr. Richard Kimble's plight. He won the Golden Globe Award for Best Actor – Television Series Drama in 1965, and was nominated in 1966. He was nominated three times for the Primetime Emmy Award for Outstanding Lead Actor in a Drama Series (1964, 1966, 1967).

==== Lt. Philip Gerard ====
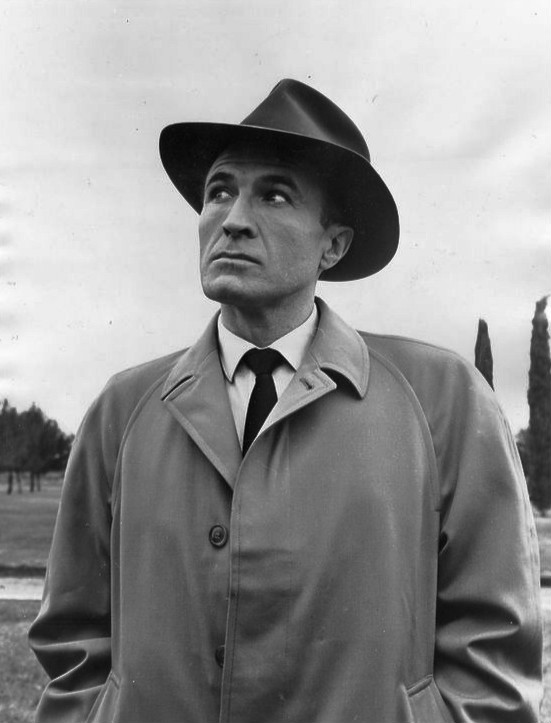
Barry Morse as Gerard in the pilot episode, 1963

Dr. Richard Kimble is pursued by the relentless Stafford police detective Lt. Philip Gerard (Barry Morse), a formidably intelligent family man and dedicated public servant. Gerard directly appears in 37 episodes and also in the main title sequences of all 120 episodes; Barry Morse is also listed in the closing credits of almost all episodes, even those in which he does not appear.

Barry Morse portrayed Gerard as a man duty-bound to capture Kimble. Guilt or innocence was of no consequence to Gerard, whose own beliefs have been stated as follows:

I enforce the law. The law pronounced him guilty; I enforce the law. ... Whether the law was right or wrong is not my concern. Let others debate and conclude; I obey ... and when I begin to question, doubt—I can't permit it. Others found him guilty; others were about to execute him. I was merely an instrument of the law ... and am -- and Dr. Kimble must be found.

— "Fear in a Desert City", 1963

In "Never Wave Goodbye: Part I", he states again, "The law pronounced him guilty, not me." In "Nightmare at Northoak" and "Wife Killer", he states with certainty that the one-armed man does not exist and that Kimble is guilty; in "Corner of Hell", even after his own Kimble-like experience, he still scoffs at the existence of the one-armed man. ("Still the same fairy tale", he says.) He also tells Kimble, "The truth is, you're still guilty before the law."

Contributing to Gerard's obsession with re-capturing Kimble is the personal responsibility he feels for Kimble's escape, which happened while he was in Gerard's custody. As he remarks to an LA police captain in "The Judgment: Part I", the show's penultimate episode, "I've lost a lot of things these past four years ... starting with a prisoner the state told me to guard."

Parallels can be seen between Gerard's pursuit of Kimble and the pursuit of Jean Valjean by Inspector Javert in Les Misérables, though Javert never lets go of his obsession to follow the letter of the law, and hunts down his fugitive, even killing himself when he discovers that he cannot reconcile his tenets with the mercy Valjean shows him. Gerard, though, was portrayed externally as a man like Javert, but internally as more of a thinking man who could balance justice and duty. According to some of those who worked on the show, these parallels were not coincidental. Stanford Whitmore, who wrote the pilot episode "Fear in a Desert City", says that he deliberately gave Kimble's nemesis a similar-sounding name to see if anyone would recognize the similarity between "Gerard" and "Javert". One who recognized the similarity was Barry Morse; he pointed out the connection to Quinn Martin, who admitted that The Fugitive was a "sort of modern rendition of the outline of Les Misérables." Barry Morse accordingly went back to the Victor Hugo novel and studied the portrayal of Javert, to find ways to make the character more complex than the "conventional 'Hollywood dick'" as whom Gerard had originally been conceived. "I've always thought that we in the arts ... are all 'shoplifters'", Barry Morse said. "Everybody, from Shakespeare onwards and downwards ... But once you've acknowledged that ... when you set out on a shoplifting expedition, you go always to Cartier's, and never to Woolworth's!"

==== The One-armed Man ====
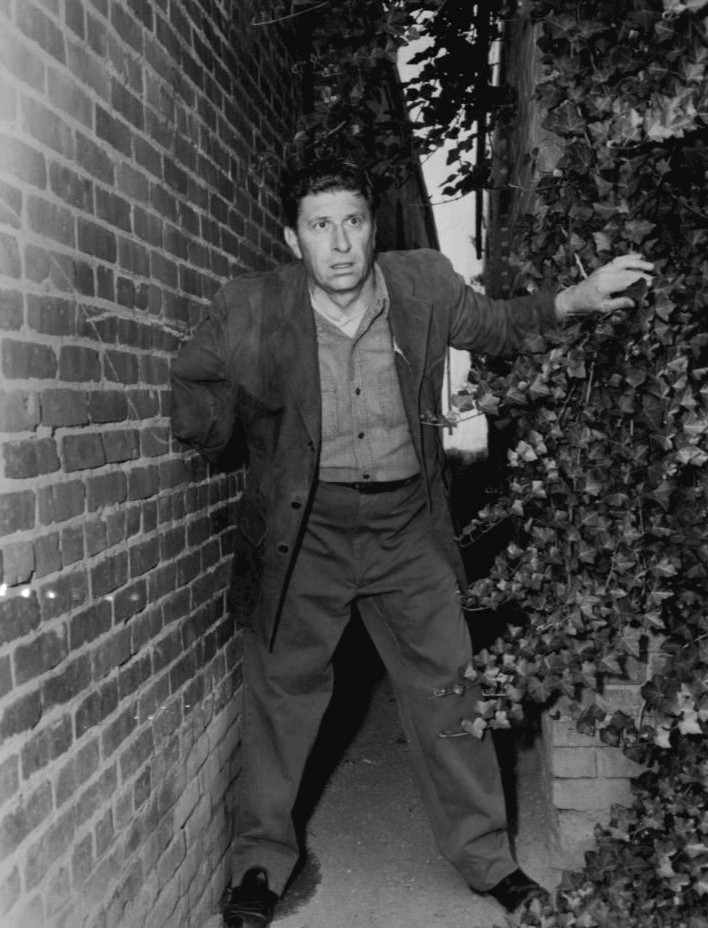
Bill Raisch as the one-armed man

"The One-armed Man" (Bill Raisch) is a shadowy figure, seen by Richard Kimble as he was fleeing the Kimble house after the murder of Helen. The series revealed little about the man's personal life and never explained how or when he lost his right arm.

In the 29th episode of the first season ("Storm Center"), Helen Kimble was revealed to have been strangled. This is not the method of choice for a man with only one arm; accordingly, this detail was later retconned, with the murder having been committed due to blunt force trauma with a lamp. (In the pilot episode, "Fear in a Desert City," Richard Kimble does state that he found his wife Helen "beaten to death.")

The One-armed Man was rarely seen in the series, appearing in person in only 10 episodes. He also appears in the opening credits beginning with season two, and in a photograph in the episode "The Breaking of the Habit". He is seen extremely infrequently in the first three seasons, and has almost no actual dialogue until season four, when his character begins to take a more prominent part in the plotline.

The One-armed Man is aware that Kimble is after him, and frequently tips off the police as to Kimble's whereabouts, most notably in "Nobody Loses All The Time", when he telephones his girlfriend (Barbara Baxley) at a hospital and orders her to call the police, though Kimble risked arrest to save her life. Like Kimble, The One-armed Man uses a variety of aliases and holds down various jobs while on the run. He uses the alias "Fred Johnson" on a couple of occasions, and both Kimble and Gerrard eventually take to referring to him as "Johnson" for the sake of convenience. There is no reason to believe, however, that Fred Johnson is the character's real name. In fact, The One-armed Man adamantly denies it under questioning, and a case could be made that a more likely real name is "Gus Evans" (a name he used prior to Helen Kimble's murder, when he wasn't himself a fugitive.)

Bill Raisch played a bitter war veteran who starts a bar fight with Kirk Douglas' John W. Burns in the 1962 film Lonely are the Brave. The role was a natural lead-in to his part in The Fugitive.

=== Minor characters ===
- Dr. Richard Kimble's murdered wife Helen (née Waverly) was portrayed in flashbacks in three episodes, including season one's "The Girl from Little Egypt" and (uncredited) in season four's "The Judgment: Part II" by Diane Brewster. She may be remembered best as one of Beaver's early teachers on Leave It to Beaver. Diane Brewster's uncredited voice is also heard in recorded messages of Helen's voice in season two's "The Survivors". However, in an extremely brief flashback in the second-season episode "Ballad for a Ghost", Helen (discovered dead) was played not by Diane Brewster but by Janis Paige; in this episode, Janis Paige also played a singer who bore a marked resemblance to Helen.
- Jacqueline Scott as Dr. Richard Kimble's married sister, Donna Taft, appeared in four stories, including the two-part series finale. A sensible mother of two boys, Donna maintains always-clandestine (and necessarily infrequent) contact with her brother. She is fully convinced of her brother's innocence, and works to have professionals have his case re-opened or to find new evidence.
- Her husband, Dr. Richard Kimble's brother-in-law, Leonard Taft, appeared in three of those stories and was played by a different actor each time: James B. Sikking in season one, Lin McCarthy in season three, and Richard Anderson in the season-four finale.
- Paul Birch appeared as Captain Carpenter, Gerard's superior at the Stafford, Indiana, police department, in 13 episodes of seasons one and two. Carpenter usually discussed details of the Kimble case with Gerard in the office; he was not involved with actual casework.
- Gerard's wife, Marie, appeared in three stories, played by a different actress each time. In "Never Wave Goodbye, Part One", she was briefly played by Rachel Ames. She was later played by British-born actress Mavis Neal Palmer, uncredited in "May God Have Mercy. In the two-part story "Landscape with Running Figures", the only story in which hers is a major role, she is played by Barbara Rush.
- The nun Sister Veronica (played by Eileen Heckart) appears in two stories - season one's two-part episode "Angels Travel on Lonely Roads" and season four's "The Breaking of the Habit". She is the only character with no direct ties to Kimble's family or the murder of Helen Kimble to appear in more than one story.

In season one, episode 15, Billy Mumy and Clint Howard appear in roles as Richard Kimble's nephews, the sons of Richard's sister Donna.

Four episodes with two parts were aired over the course of the series, all of them featuring characters in both parts. "Never Wave Goodbye" features in both parts, in addition to Gerard, Susan Oliver as Karen Christian, Robert Duvall as her brother Eric, and Lee Philips as Dr. Ray Brooks, with Richard Kimble and Karen Christian falling in love, while Ray pines for Karen. "Angels Travel on Lonely Roads" has in both parts, in addition to Sister Veronica, Albert Salmi as Chuck Mathers, the brutish owner of a gas station who gives Kimble trouble and later tries to collect the reward money when he finds out who Kimble is; filling in for Gerard (this is the only two-parter in which Gerard does not appear) are Sandy Kenyon as a local sheriff and Ken Lynch as a local plainclothes police detective. "Landscape with Running Figures" has in both parts, in addition to Lt. Gerard and Mrs. Gerard, Herschel Bernardi and Jud Taylor as two local plainclothes police officers assisting Gerard in the manhunt. The series finale, "The Judgment", has, in both parts, in addition to Gerard, Donna, Leonard, and the One-armed Man, also Diane Baker as a Kimble family friend from Stafford, Jean Carlisle, and she leaves arm-in-arm with Dr. Richard Kimble in the final scene of the series.

Only the character of Dr. Richard Kimble is present onscreen in every episode; off-screen narrator William Conrad is also heard at the beginning and end of each episode, though he was never credited, while a different voice announces the title of the episode and the names of the episode's guest stars in the opening teaser. That announcer (an uncredited Dick Wesson) also says, "The Fugitive" aloud at the end of the closing credits leading into studio sponsorships of the series ("'The Fugitive' has been brought to you by ..."). The Untouchables, which was Martin's first series as a producer, also contained both a narrator (Walter Winchell) and an announcer (Les Lampson), as did The New Breed, the first series QM Productions produced, with Dick Wesson as the announcer and Art Gilmore as the narrator.

=== Guest cast ===
With 120 episodes and typically two or more guest stars per episode, the series offered a massive who's who of stars from stage and screen, character actors, and up-and-coming talent. Many guest stars appeared as different characters in multiple episodes. Here is a partial list:

- Six episodes: Richard Anderson, Dabbs Greer
- Five episodes: Crahan Denton, Bruce Dern, Carol Eve Rossen, Jud Taylor, Harry Townes
- Four episodes: Joseph Campanella, Dabney Coleman, Diana Hyland, Lin McCarthy, David Sheiner
- Three episodes: Elizabeth Allen, Lou Antonio, R. G. Armstrong, Ed Asner, Malcolm Atterbury, Edward Binns, Antoinette Bower, Geraldine Brooks, Michael Constantine, Robert Doyle, Robert Duvall, Harold Gould, Arch Johnson, Shirley Knight, John Milford, Joanna Moore, Laurence Naismith, Lois Nettleton, Tim O'Connor, Woodrow Parfrey, Phillip Pine, Don Quine, Telly Savalas, Patricia Smith, June Dayton
- 2 episodes: John Anderson, Ed Begley, Beau Bridges, James T. Callahan, J. D. Cannon, Paul Carr, Russell Collins, James Daly, Kim Darby, Ivan Dixon, James Doohan, Robert Drivas, Andrew Duggan, Norman Fell, Lloyd Gough, Murray Hamilton, June Harding, Pat Hingle, Celeste Holm, Clint Howard, Steve Ihnat, Johnny Jensen, Georgann Johnson, Wright King, Jack Klugman, Ted Knight, John Larch, Nancy Malone, Paul Mantee, Joe Maross, Nan Martin, Ed Nelson, Leslie Nielsen, Sheree North, Warren Oates, Arthur O'Connell, Collin Wilcox Paxton, Suzanne Pleshette, Andrew Prine, Madlyn Rhue, Paul Richards, Peter Mark Richman, Gilbert Roland, Carlos Romero, Barbara Rush, Janice Rule, Kurt Russell, Albert Salmi, Brenda Scott, Milton Selzer, Madeleine Sherwood, Tom Skerritt, Julie Sommars, Michael Strong, Malachi Throne, Joan Tompkins, Diana Van Der Vlis, Ruth White, Nancy Wickwire, Donald Losby

Other notable guest star appearances:

- Claude Akins
- Martin Balsam
- Peter Brocco
- Charles Bronson
- Richard Carlson
- Michael Conrad
- Tim Considine
- Patricia Crowley
- Ossie Davis
- Ruby Dee
- Gabriel Dell
- Sandy Dennis
- Angie Dickinson
- Melvyn Douglas
- James Farentino
- Anne Francis
- James Frawley
- Betty Garrett
- Mark Goddard
- Gloria Grahame
- Lee Grant
- Arthur Hill
- Steven Hill
- Earl Holliman
- Ronny Howard
- Dean Jagger
- Brian Keith
- DeForest Kelley
- Diane Ladd
- Hope Lange
- Carol Lawrence
- Ruta Lee
- Jack Lord
- Kevin McCarthy
- John McGiver
- Vera Miles
- Greg Morris
- Bill Mumy
- Carroll O'Connor
- Susan Oliver
- Warren Oates
- Jerry Paris
- Larry Pennell
- Slim Pickens
- Donald Pleasence
- Percy Rodriguez
- Mickey Rooney
- Kerry Rossall
- Bing Russell
- Diana Sands
- Pippa Scott
- Vin Scully
- William Shatner
- James Sikking
- Rudy Solari
- Frank Sutton
- Pamela Tiffin
- Brenda Vaccaro
- George Voskovec
- Jessica Walter
- Jack Warden
- Fritz Weaver
- Robert Webber
- Tuesday Weld
- Jack Weston
- William Windom
- Lana Wood

== Production ==
Production logo, used during the making of the television series.

=== Development ===
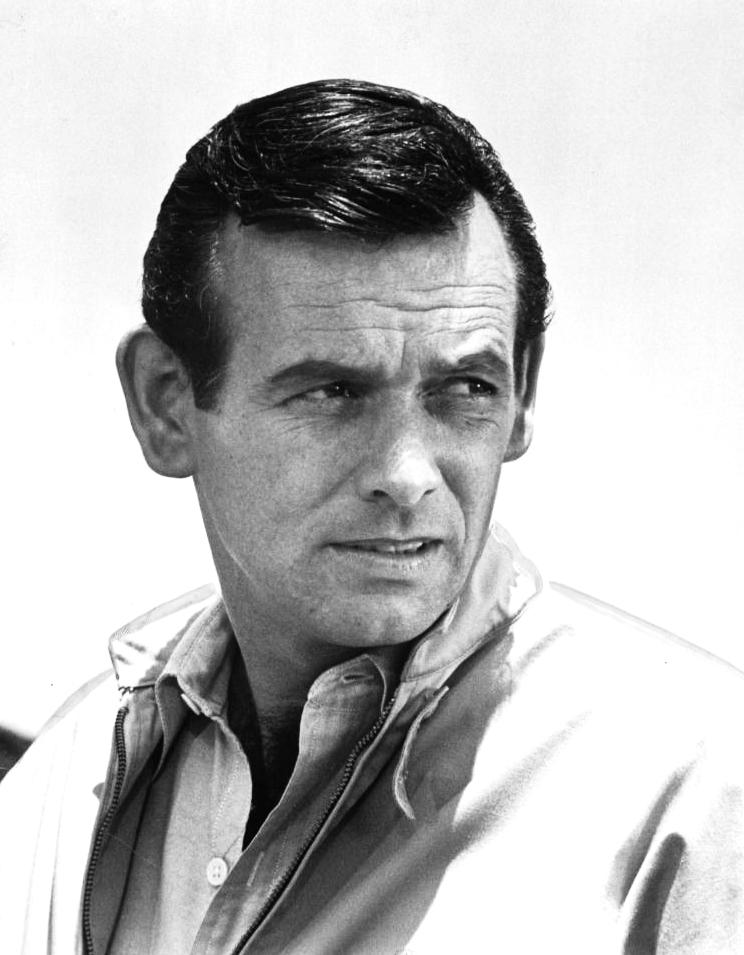
David Janssen as The Fugitive

The series was conceived by Roy Huggins and produced by Quinn Martin. Though Huggins disclaimed the similarities, the show was based in part on the case of Sam Sheppard, as well as other influences including Les Misérables. Although convicted and imprisoned, Sheppard claimed that his wife Marilyn had been murdered by a "bushy-haired man". Sheppard's brothers hired F. Lee Bailey to appeal the conviction. Bailey defended Sheppard and won an acquittal in the second trial. Coincidentally, the show's music supervisor, Ken Wilhoit, was married to Susan Hayes, who had had an intimate relationship with Sheppard prior to the murder and testified during the first trial in 1954.

The show presents a popular plot device of an innocent man on the run from the police for a murder he did not commit, while simultaneously pursuing the real killer. It had its antecedents in the Alfred Hitchcock movies The 39 Steps, Saboteur, and North by Northwest. The theme of a doctor in hiding for committing a major crime had also been depicted by James Stewart as the mysterious Buttons the Clown, who never removed his makeup, in The Greatest Show on Earth. Writer David Goodis claimed that the series was inspired by his 1946 novel Dark Passage, about a man who escapes from prison after being wrongly convicted of killing his wife. Goodis' litigation over the issue continued for some time after his 1967 death.

The plot device of a fugitive living on the run from the authorities was loosely inspired by Victor Hugo's 1862 novel Les Misérables. The Richard Kimble character was inspired by the novel's protagonist, Jean Valjean, an ex-convict living a life as a fugitive and having numerous aliases, as well as helping people around him. The character of Lt. Gerard, who hounds Kimble throughout the series, is also loosely inspired by a character from the same novel, a relentless police inspector named Javert, who is obsessed with capturing the fugitive.

Other shows, such as Route 66, had employed the same anthology-like premise of wanderers finding adventure in each new place to which they came. The Fugitive, however, answered two questions that had bedeviled many similar series – first, why the protagonist never settled down anywhere, and second, why the protagonist tried to solve these problems himself instead of calling in the police. Casting a doctor as the protagonist also provided the series a wider "range of entry" into local stories, as Kimble's medical knowledge would allow him alone to recognize essential elements of the episode (e.g., subtle medical symptoms or an abused medicine), and the commonplace doctor's ethic (e.g., to provide aid in emergencies) would naturally lead him into dangerous situations.

=== Musical score ===
Pete Rugolo, who had worked on David Janssen's earlier series Richard Diamond, Private Detective, composed the original music for The Fugitive. (Rugolo later worked with creator Roy Huggins on Run for Your Life and other projects.) Tracking music was standard practice at the time, but unlike virtually all primetime scripted series of the 1960s, no episode – not even "The Judgment" – received an original score (i.e. scored to picture); all the original music used for the series was composed by Rugolo and recorded in London before the series was filmed. In fact, many episodes had Rugolo as the sole credited composer for their scores, but only a fraction of all the music heard throughout the series was original Rugolo music. Library music (either from other classic TV shows or from stock music libraries, as was the case with The Adventures of Superman) provided a majority of the episodes' scores. For example, Dominic Frontiere cues became common in season four; a keen listener could find oneself listening to such cues from the Outer Limits series during the climactic final episode of The Fugitive. Numerous ominous, dramatic, and suspenseful cues from The Twilight Zone episodes such as "The Invaders", among others, are used to strong effect throughout the series. The old pop songs "I'll Never Smile Again" and "I'll Remember April" each appear several times in the series, often associated with Kimble's deceased wife, Helen.

What little original melody was actually written and recorded was built around a fast-paced tempo representing running music. Different variations, from sad to action-oriented, would be used, with many arrangements developed for the music supervisor to select as best suited for particular scenes. Also, an original "Dragnet"-type theme was used for Lt. Gerard.

In the unreleased longer version of the show's pilot, a different (canned) music score was used in the opening and closing sequences. Also, several deleted scenes were shot, including one, with Lt. Gerard talking to Captain Carpenter, that was reshot. Quinn Martin felt it made Gerard out to be a bit deranged in his obsession. That version also listed William Conrad as the narrator in the end credits.

When the series was first issued on DVD beginning in 2007, current rights holder CBS could not use all music that had been used in the original broadcasts on the DVD releases due to rights issues with the Capitol and CBS stock music libraries, so new original scores (which had never previously been done to the series to begin with) composed and performed by Mark Heyes had to be commissioned to replace the musical cues in question, although Pete Rugolo's main and end title themes were retained.

== Episodes ==
Season	Episodes	Originally released	
Season	Episodes	First released	Last released
1	30	September 17, 1963	April 21, 1964
2	30	September 15, 1964	April 20, 1965
3	30	September 14, 1965	April 26, 1966
4	30	September 13, 1966	August 29, 1967

The Fugitive premiered in the United States on September 17, 1963. Over the course of the show's four seasons, 120 episodes were produced, with the last original episode airing in the United States on August 29, 1967. The series aired Tuesdays at 10:00 pm on ABC.

=== Final episode ===
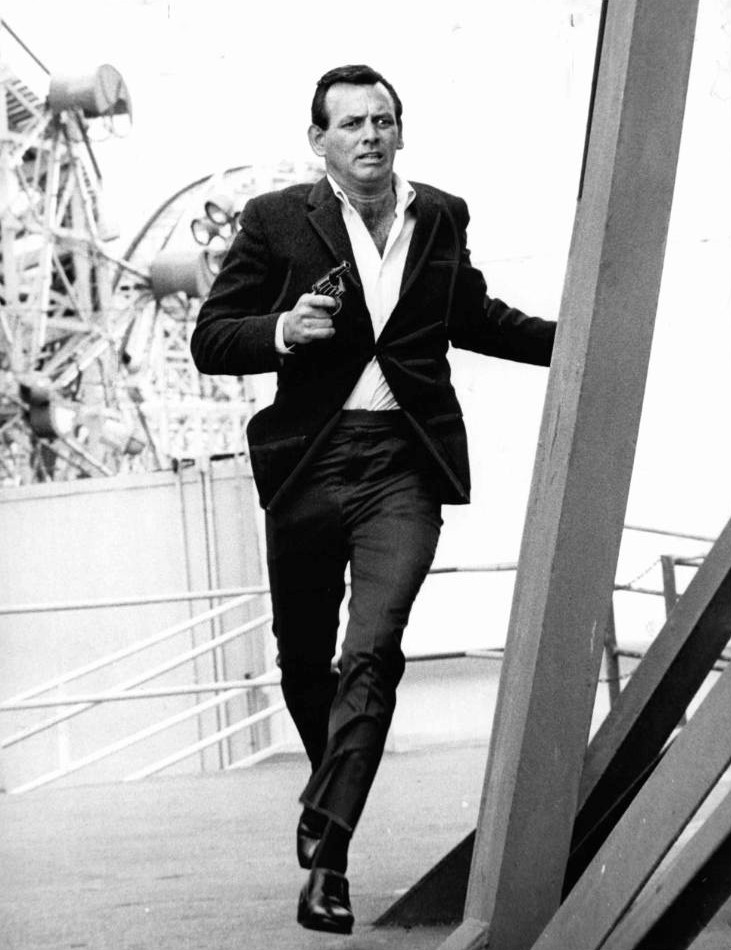
A scene from the final episode

The two-part final episode, titled "The Judgment", aired on Tuesdays, August 22 and 29, 1967.

It ends with an exonerated Kimble leaves the courthouse and hesitantly shakes Gerard's hand. Kimble and Jean walk off toward his new life. Narrator William Conrad states, "Tuesday, August 29th: The day the running stopped."

Assessment

According to Ed Robertson's book The Fugitive Recaptured (the first book written about the series), the final episode aired in Canada on September 5, 1967, with an alternate closing narration, giving that date. The "Special Features" DVD states that the final episode was interrupted in some parts of the U.S. This version was also seen in some areas in syndication and was later released on VHS tape. Both versions are available on DVD.

Part two of the finale was the most-watched television series episode up to that time. It was viewed by 25.7 million households (45.9 percent of American households with a television set and a 72 percent share), meaning that more than 78 million people tuned in. That record was held until the November 21, 1980 episode of Dallas, titled "Who Done It", viewed by 41.47 million households (53.3 percent of households and a 76 percent share), which was later surpassed by the series finale of M*A*S*H, titled "Goodbye, Farewell and Amen", on February 28, 1983, viewed by 50.15 million households (60.2 percent of households and a 77 percent share). According to producer Leonard Goldberg, the network was simply going to end the series with a regular episode without any kind of denouement, as network executives were totally oblivious to the concept that a television audience actually tuned in week after week and cared about the characters of a TV series. The timing of the broadcast was unusual: Rather than ending the regular season, the finale was held back while suspense continued through the summer reruns.

In 1997, "The Judgment, Part 2" was ranked No. 23 on TV Guide's 100 Greatest Episodes of All Time.

== Reception ==
=== Ratings ===
In its debut season, The Fugitive was 28th in the U.S. Nielsen ratings (with a 21.7 rating), and it jumped to fifth in the second season (27.9). It fell out of the top 30 during the last two seasons, but the series finale, in which Dr. Kimble's fate was shown, currently holds the third rank for the all-time highest U.S. television household share, at 72%.

The Fugitive season rankings in the U.S. television market
Season	Episodes	Original air dates		TV season	Nielsen ratings		
Season	Episodes	Season premiere	Season finale	TV season	Rank	Rating	Viewers (millions)
1	30	September 17, 1963	April 21, 1964	1963–64	#28	21.7%	11,197,200
2	30	September 15, 1964	April 20, 1965	1964–65	#5	27.9%	14,703,300
3	30	September 14, 1965	April 26, 1966	1965–66	#34	—N/a	—N/a
4	30	September 13, 1966	August 29, 1967	1966–67	#50	—N/a	—N/a

=== Awards ===
The Fugitive was nominated for five Emmy Awards and won the Emmy for Outstanding Dramatic Series in 1966. In 2002, it was ranked No. 36 on TV Guide's 50 Greatest TV Shows of All Time. TV Guide named the one-armed man No. 5 in their 2013 list of The 60 Nastiest Villains of All Time.

The show also came away with other honors. In 1965, Alan Armer, the producer of the series, received an Edgar Award from the Mystery Writers of America for his work. And in a 1993 ranking, TV Guide named The Fugitive the best dramatic series of the 1960s.

== Home media ==
A total of 40 episodes have been released on VHS by NuVentures Video (Volumes 1–10 were later re-released with Barry Morse providing introductions to each episode, as in Volumes 11–20), with selected shows from the 40 later issued by Republic Pictures. Twelve episodes were also released on laserdisc.

Currently, Republic Pictures and CBS Television Studios own the copyrights to the series (while CBS itself now owns distribution rights); CBS DVD (with distribution by Paramount Pictures Home Entertainment) released Season 1, Volume 1 on DVD in Region 1 in late 2007. Reviews of the first DVD set have been very positive as the show appears uncut, unedited and uncompressed, digitally transferred and re-mastered from the original negatives and restored from original magnetic soundtrack, although a disclaimer by CBS mentions some episodes are "edited from their original broadcast versions" and some music changed for home video. Incidental music was altered in at least two episodes, "Where the Action Is" and "The Garden House". There are no subtitles or alternate languages, but English closed captions are provided, and the "liner notes" consist merely of TV-Guide-style episode synopses inside the four-disc holder. Season 1, Volume 2 was released on February 26, 2008. Season 2, Volume 1 was released on June 10, 2008. Many reviews of this third DVD set were highly negative due to the replacement of the original used music tracks with the aforementioned synthesizer music (see Musical score section above for details.) Season 3, Volume 1 was released on October 27, 2009, and Season 3, Volume 2 was released on December 8, 2009, with most, but not all, of the original music intact. Season 4, volume 1 was released on November 2, 2010. This volume was the first to include any extras, including a Featurette titled "Season of Change: Composer Dominic Frontiere". Season 4, Volume 2 was released on February 15, 2011.

On October 23, 2012, CBS released The Fugitive: The Most Wanted Edition on DVD in Region 1. This 34 disc set featured all 120 episodes of the series as well as bonus features, such as the unaired version of the pilot with different footage. The set was recalled due to possible music issues, but some sets were released. The set was later re-released with 5 replacement discs, so that now all original music is intact.

On February 9, 2015, CBS Home Entertainment announced they would release a repackaged The Fugitive: The Complete Series on DVD at a lower price on May 5, 2015 but did not include the bonus disc that was part of the original complete series set.

CBS's rights only cover the original series; the later productions were handled by Warner Bros. Entertainment.

DVD name	No. of episodes	Release date
Season 1, Volume 1	15	August 14, 2007
Season 1, Volume 2	15	February 26, 2008
Season 2, Volume 1	15	June 10, 2008
Season 2, Volume 2	15	March 31, 2009
Season 3, Volume 1	15	October 27, 2009
Season 3, Volume 2	15	December 8, 2009
Season 4, Volume 1	15	November 2, 2010
Season 4, Volume 2	15	February 15, 2011
The Most Wanted Edition	120	October 23, 2012
The Complete Series	120	May 5, 2015

== In other media ==
=== Soundtrack ===
In 1963, a soundtrack was issued containing the key music that Rugolo wrote and recorded for the series. In 2001, it was released on CD from Silva Screen Records. About 40 minutes in length, this CD contains mono yet hi-fidelity cuts and cues that were recorded in London.

1. "Theme from The Fugitive" (1:18)
2. "The Kimbles" (2:48)
3. "Tragic Homecoming" (3:53)
4. "Under Arrest" (1:43)
5. "LT. Gerard" (1:46)
6. "The Verdict/Train Wreck" (2:07)
7. "On the Run" (1:57)
8. "The Life of a Fugitive" (1:27)
9. "Main Title Theme" (:39)
10. "Life on the Road" (1:35)
11. "Main Theme – Jazz Version" (1:30)
12. "The One-Armed Man's Name Is Fred Johnson" (2:38)
13. "Brass Interlude" (2:53)
14. "Sorrow" (1:03)
15. "Dreams of the Past" (1:11)
16. "Youthful Innocence" (1:35)
17. "Back on the Road" (1:11)
18. "A New Love" (2:16)
19. "Family Reunion" (2:34)
20. "Watching and Waiting" (1:33)
21. "Kimble vs. the One-Armed Man/Hand to Hand" (5:11)
22. "The Day the Running Stopped" (2:12)
23. "Freedom and Finale" (0:43)
24. "End Credits" (1:09)

=== Syndication/cable ===
The Fugitive was part of the original lineup on the Arts & Entertainment Network (A&E), beginning in February 1984. It ran until the summer of 1994. The show also appeared on the nationwide WWOR EMI Service and briefly on Nickelodeon's TV Land network in 2000.

In February 2015, reruns of The Fugitive appeared on Decades, a new Digital TV (DTV) subchannel network co-owned by Weigel Broadcasting and CBS. The Fugitive was seen as part of its "Countdown to Decades", in which all four seasons of The Fugitive was played in sequence 24 hours a day. The two part finale was shown on Monday May 25, 2015, at 5 am and 6 am ET. Decades was available in over 45% of all US TV viewing households at that time, including markets where CBS owned & operated a DTV station. MeTV airs "The Fugitive" on late Sunday nights/Early Monday mornings at 1 AM CT (2018). From July 2020, the series is being repeated in the United Kingdom on CBS Justice. The series was originally broadcast in the United Kingdom from 1963 to 1967 on the different ITV regional channels across the country, although the Associated-Rediffusion region in and around London chose not to show Series 4 apart from later broadcasting the final two episodes in April 1968. All original transmissions of Series 4 in the UK were in black and white, as ITV didn't begin broadcasting programmes in colour until 15 November 1969.

== Remakes and spin-offs ==
=== Film ===
==== The Fugitive (1993) ====
A feature film of the same name, based on the series, was directed by Andrew Davis and released by Warner Bros. Pictures on August 6, 1993, starring Harrison Ford as Kimble, Tommy Lee Jones as Gerard (now named "Samuel" instead of "Philip"), and Andreas Katsulas as the one-armed man (now called Fredrick Sykes instead of Fred Johnson). The movie's success came as Hollywood was embarking on a trend of remaking old television series into features. In the film, Kimble is portrayed as a prominent Chicago vascular surgeon instead of a small-town Indiana pediatrician, while Gerard is portrayed as a U.S. Marshal rather than a police lieutenant. Kimble's wife is killed in an attempt on Kimble's own life (rather than during a robbery attempt, as in the TV series) as the result of a conspiracy involving a pharmaceutical company called Devlin MacGregor, by which the one-armed man is employed.

However, the film remained true to its source material—in particular, the notion that Kimble's kindness led him to help others even when it posed a danger to his freedom or physical safety. The film also showed Gerard pursuing his own investigation into the murder as part of his pursuit of Kimble and coming up with his own doubts as to the case.

Roy Huggins, who created The Fugitive for television, is credited as executive producer of the film version. At the time of the film's release, Huggins told the Los Angeles Times, "The filmmakers and the people at Warners did a tremendously good job with this movie... I don't really take any credit for it. Wish I could."

To coincide with the film's theatrical release, NBC aired the show's first and last episodes in the summer of 1993, and later hosted the film's broadcast television premiere in 1996. Jones received the 1993 Academy Award for Best Supporting Actor. The film was nominated for six other Academy Awards, including Best Picture. It also spawned a spin-off, U.S. Marshals, in which Jones reprised his role as Gerard. The motion picture was later developed into a parody film as well, called Wrongfully Accused, with Leslie Nielsen portraying the lead character.

==== Criminal (1994) ====
Criminal is a 1994 Indian Hindi-language action thriller film directed by Mahesh Bhatt, starring Nagarjuna, Manisha Koirala, Ramya Krishna. Shot simultaneously in Telugu and Hindi languages. Criminal was an Indian adaptation to the 1993 American film The Fugitive.

==== Nirnayam (1995) ====
The Indian Malayalam-language movie Nirnayam, directed by Santosh Sivan, follows the same storyline.

=== Television ===
==== The Fugitive (2000) ====
A short-lived TV series remake (CBS, October 6, 2000 – May 25, 2001) of the same name also aired, starring Tim Daly as Kimble, Mykelti Williamson as Gerard, and Stephen Lang as the one-armed man. It was filmed in various places, including Seattle, Washington. CBS cancelled the series after one season, leaving a cliffhanger unresolved.

==== The Fugitive (2020) ====
A spinoff that was broadcast on the Quibi platform, features Boyd Holbrook as a new fugitive, blue-collar worker Mike Ferro, who is wrongly accused of setting off a bomb on a Los Angeles subway train. He is relentlessly pursued by Detective Clay Bryce (Kiefer Sutherland), a legendary cop who is uncovering evidence that Mike may not be guilty.

==== The Fugitive (2020) ====
A two-part TV miniseries, Tōbōsha, was broadcast on TV Asahi which stars Ken Watanabe as Dr. Kazuki Kakurai in a plot that closely follows the 1993 film. (See also Monster, inspired by The Fugitive.)

== In popular culture ==
=== Comic books ===
In 1966, Dante Quinterno dedicated issue 106, volume 9 of the famed comic book Patoruzito, as a homage to The Fugitive. With the title being "El Evadido" and Isidorito mentioning on page 7, "I suspect that the doctor may be innocent, as in the TV show," breaking the fourth wall, as it were.

== Bibliography ==
- Proctor, Mel (1995). The Official Fan's Guide to the Fugitive. Stamford, CT: Longmeadow Press. ISBN 978-0-681007-54-3. OCLC 31606751.
- Robertson, Ed (1993), The Fugitive Recaptured: The 30th Anniversary Companion to a Television Classic, Introduction by Stephen King, Foreword by Barry Morse, Los Angeles, CA: Pomegranate Press, Ltd., ISBN 978-0-938817-34-5
- Starman, Ray (2006). TV Noir: The Twentieth Century. Troy, NY: Troy Bookmakers Press. "Theme and major chapters on film noir and TV noir related to the American TV program The Fugitive"
- Quinterno, Dante (1966). El Evadido: Volume 9, Number 106. Buenos Aires, Argentina: Editorial Dante Quinterno. "monthly comic book paying homage to The Fugitive"
