= The Fugitive (1993 film) =

1993 film by Andrew Davis

- Theatrical release poster
- Directed by: Andrew Davis
- Screenplay by: Jeb Stuart; David Twohy
- Story by: David Twohy
- Based on: The Fugitive; 1963 TV series by Roy Huggins
- Produced by: Arnold Kopelson
- Starring: Harrison Ford; Tommy Lee Jones; Sela Ward; Julianne Moore; Joe Pantoliano; Andreas Katsulas; Jeroen Krabbé
- Cinematography: Michael Chapman
- Edited by: Don Brochu; David Finfer; Dean Goodhill; Dov Hoenig; Richard Nord; Dennis Virkler
- Music by: James Newton Howard
- Production company: Kopelson Entertainment
- Distributed by: Warner Bros.
- Release dates: July 29, 1993 (Westwood); August 6, 1993 (United States)
- Running time: 130 minutes
- Country: United States
- Language: English
- Budget: $44 million
- Box office: $368.9 million

The Fugitive is a 1993 American action thriller film, directed by Andrew Davis, with a script co-written by Jeb Stuart and David Twohy, from a previous story draft which Twohy had written. Based on the 1960s TV series, itself loosely inspired by the trial of Sam Sheppard, the film stars Harrison Ford, Tommy Lee Jones, Sela Ward, Julianne Moore, Joe Pantoliano, Andreas Katsulas, and Jeroen Krabbé.

After being framed for the murder of his wife and sentenced to death, vascular surgeon Dr. Richard Kimble (Ford) escapes from custody following a bus crash. Kimble sets out to find the real killer and clear his name, while being hunted by the police and a team of U.S. marshals, led by Deputy Samuel Gerard (Jones).

The Fugitive premiered in Westwood, California, on July 29, 1993, and was released in the United States by Warner Bros. on August 6, 1993. It was a critical and commercial success, spending six weeks as the number-one film in the United States, and grossing nearly $368 million worldwide against a $44 million budget. It was the third-highest-grossing film of 1993 worldwide, with an estimated 44 million tickets sold in the United States. It was nominated for seven Academy Awards, including Best Picture; Tommy Lee Jones won for Best Supporting Actor. It was followed by the 1998 film U.S. Marshals, in which Jones reprised his role as Deputy Marshal Sam Gerard, along with some others of his earlier marshals team.

== Plot ==
In Chicago, vascular surgeon Dr. Richard Kimble is arrested for the murder of his wife, Helen. Despite his claims that he caught a man with a prosthetic arm in the act, Helen's misinterpreted 911 call and substantial life insurance policy serve as evidence against Kimble. He is convicted of her murder and sentenced to death.

En route to prison, Kimble's fellow prisoners stage an escape. In the chaos, the driver is shot dead and their bus crashes into the path of an oncoming train. Kimble risks his life to pull a wounded officer to safety before fleeing. In response, relentless and uncompromising Deputy US Marshal Samuel Gerard and his staff launch a manhunt.

Meanwhile, Kimble sneaks into a hospital to treat his injuries and disguises his appearance. The wounded officer is brought to the hospital and recognizes Kimble, who escapes in an ambulance. The marshals block Kimble's path, so he slips into a storm drain, pursued by Gerard. Kimble asserts his innocence, but Gerard responds that he does not care. Cornered at the end of a steep dam spillway, Kimble makes the dangerous jump into the waters below to escape.

Determined to find his wife's killer, Kimble returns to Chicago and seeks help from his friend, Dr. Charles Nichols. Posing as a janitor, Kimble infiltrates Cook County Hospital to identify patients who required recent prosthetic adjustments. Afterwards, Kimble is asked to move a young patient on a gurney. Noticing he has been misdiagnosed, he changes the boy's file, saving his life. A doctor notices his interference and alerts security, forcing him to flee. Gerard investigates the incident and, after deducing Kimble is searching for his "one-armed man", also compiles a list of suspects.

Gerard and Kimble encounter each other at Chicago City Hall while approaching the same suspect. In the ensuing chase, Gerard loses Kimble in the St. Patrick's Day parade crowds. Later, Kimble breaks into the home of another suspect, Fredrick Sykes. Kimble recognizes Sykes as his wife's killer and discovers evidence linking Sykes to his former colleague, Dr. Alec Lentz, and Devlin-MacGregor, a multibillion-dollar pharmaceutical company developing a drug called Provasic. Kimble had reviewed Provasic and discovered it causes liver damage, which should have prevented the drug being approved for sale. He calls Gerard from Sykes's home to lead him there. Suspicious at what he finds, Gerard puts Sykes under surveillance, but he sneaks away. Kimble realizes that the Provasic-afflicted liver samples he sent to Lentz were tampered with, to hide the side effects. They were then approved in Lentz's name, on the same day that he died under suspicious circumstances. Kimble deduces that Nichols was responsible and Gerard draws the same conclusion.

Aboard a train to the medical conference in a hotel where Nichols will unveil Provasic, Kimble is attacked by Sykes, who shoots an intervening police officer dead. Kimble subdues Sykes, but the police assume Kimble killed the officer and order him shot on sight. At the conference, Kimble publicly confronts Nichols for killing Lentz and concealing Provasic's side effects for profit and a directorship at Devlin-MacGregor. The pair fight through the hotel, pursued by Gerard. Kimble accuses Nichols of sending Sykes to kill him for opposing Provasic, inadvertently resulting in Helen's murder as Kimble was unexpectedly called to work. Gerard calls out to Kimble, asserting his belief in his innocence after finding evidence of Nichols's guilt. Nichols knocks out Gerard's colleague, takes his gun, and readies to shoot Gerard, but Kimble saves him by knocking Nichols out with a pipe. Kimble surrenders, and Sykes and Nichols are arrested.

While reporters query the police over failings in the case, Kimble is escorted to Gerard's car, where he reminds him of his earlier claim that he did not care. Gerard wryly asks him to keep it a secret that he does.

== Cast ==
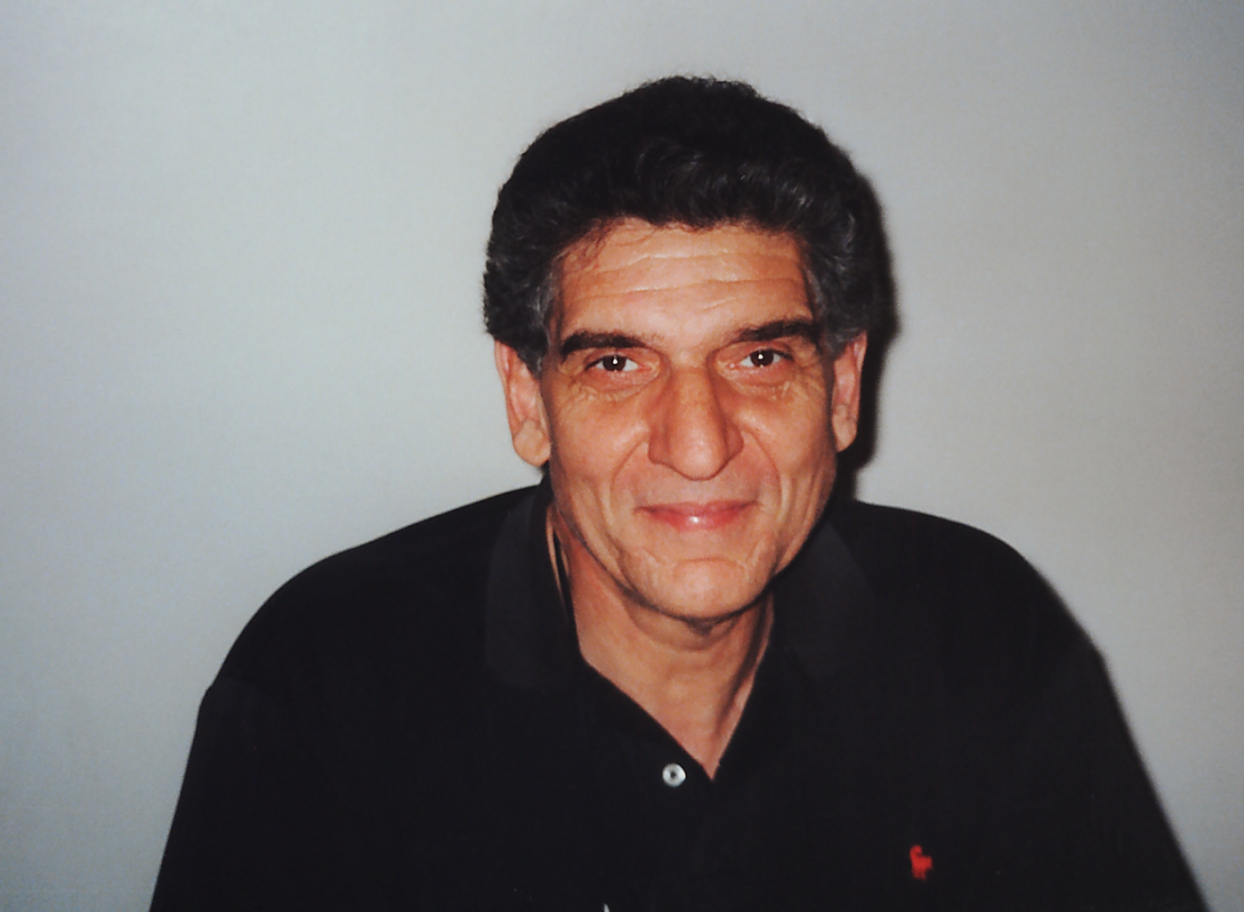
Andreas Katsulas portrayed Fredrick Sykes, also known as the "one-armed man".

- Harrison Ford as Dr. Richard Kimble
- Tommy Lee Jones as Deputy U.S. Marshal Sam Gerard
- Sela Ward as Helen Kimble
- Julianne Moore as Dr. Anne Eastman
- Joe Pantoliano as Deputy U.S. Marshal Cosmo Renfro
- Andreas Katsulas as Fredrick Sykes
- Jeroen Krabbé as Dr. Charles Nichols
- Daniel Roebuck as Deputy U.S. Marshal Robert Biggs
- Tom Wood as Deputy U.S. Marshal Noah Newman
- L. Scott Caldwell as Deputy U.S. Marshal Erin Poole
- Johnny Lee Davenport as Deputy U.S. Marshal Henry
- Ron Dean as Detective Kelly
- Joseph Kosala as Detective Rosetti
- Jane Lynch as Dr. Kathy Wahlund
- Dick Cusack as Attorney Walter Gutherie
- Andy Romano as Judge Bennett
- Nick Searcy as Sheriff Rawlins
- Eddie Bo Smith as Copeland
- Neil Flynn as Transit Cop
- Richard Riehle as Old Guard
- Kirsten Nelson as Hospital Secretary
- David Darlow as Dr. Alec Lentz
- Frank Ray Perilli as Corrections Officer
- Lester Holt as Newscaster
- David U. Hodges as Marshal David
- John M. Watson Sr. as Bones Roosevelt
- Roland Burris as Smiling Man in Parade

== Production ==
In October 1988, it was announced that a film version of The Fugitive was to begin filming in March 1989 produced by Arnold Kopelson and Keith Barish, with series writer Roy Huggins as executive producer.

=== Casting ===
Harrison Ford was not originally cast for the role of Dr. Richard Kimble. Instead, a number of actors were auditioned for the part, including Alec Baldwin, Nick Nolte, Kevin Costner, and Michael Douglas. Nick Nolte in particular felt he was too old for the role (though he is only a year older than Harrison Ford). Baldwin was cast in the role when Walter Hill was attached to direct. Andrew Davis was later hired to direct after Ford replaced Baldwin. Ford had long expressed interest in the role when Stephen Frears was previously in talks to direct. According to Ford in a 2023 interview with James Hibberd of The Hollywood Reporter, he pursued the role of Richard Kimble in part due to his preference for playing characters dissimilar to him, as well as a desire to grow a beard or moustache for a role, something then-Warner Bros. Pictures chairman Robert A. Daly had repeatedly prevented on the grounds that he was "paying for Harrison Ford's face" and wished to see it unobstructed by facial hair (although Ford only spends the early parts of the film with his full beard). Although the role of Sam Gerard went to Tommy Lee Jones, Andrew Davis considered both Gene Hackman and Jon Voight for the role. The character of Dr. Charles Nichols was recast for Jeroen Krabbé after the original actor who landed the role, Richard Jordan, fell ill with a brain tumor. Jordan died three weeks after the film's release.

=== Filming ===
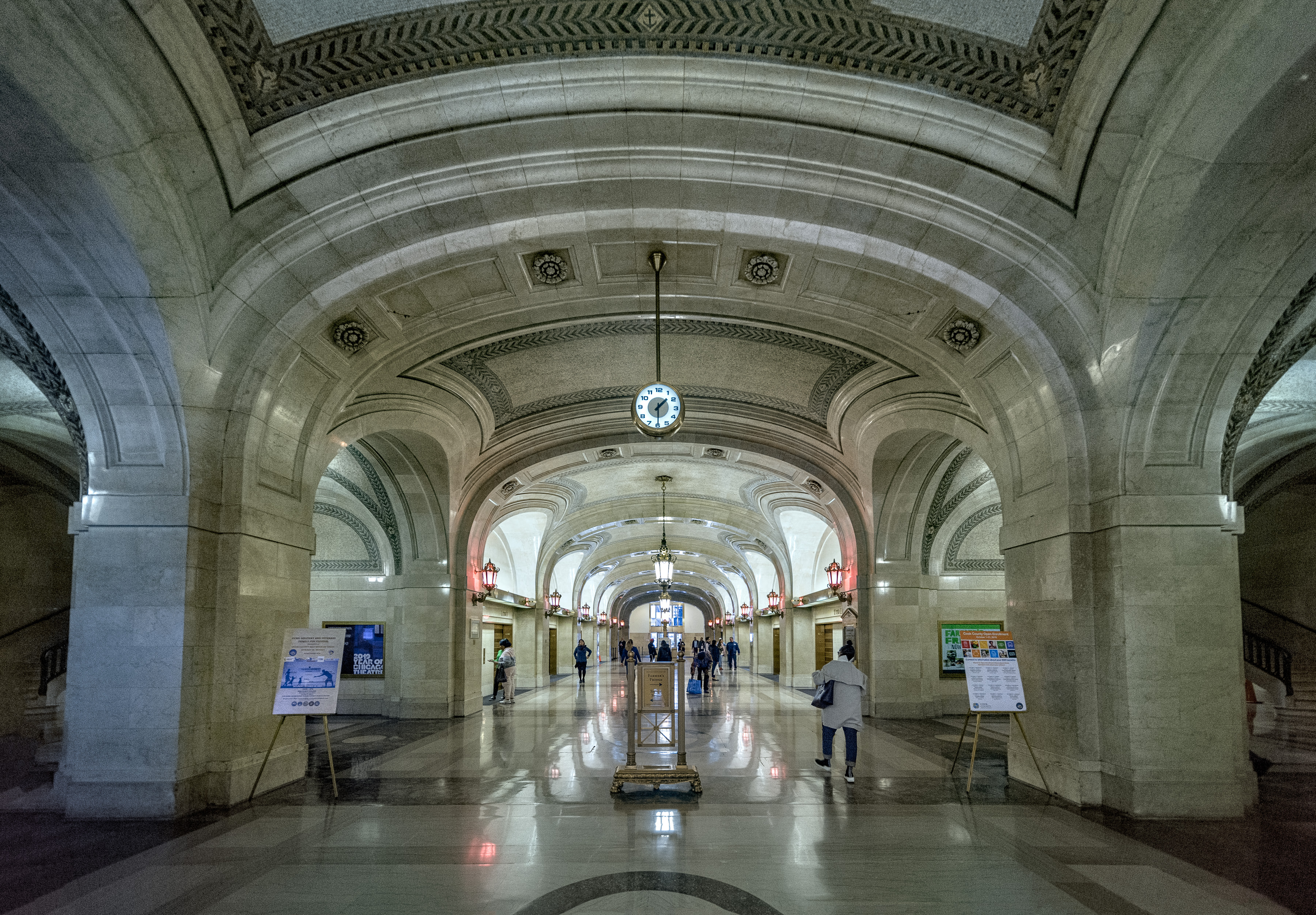
Inside the lobby of Chicago City Hall, where the scenes featuring Gerard's chase reaching its climax were filmed

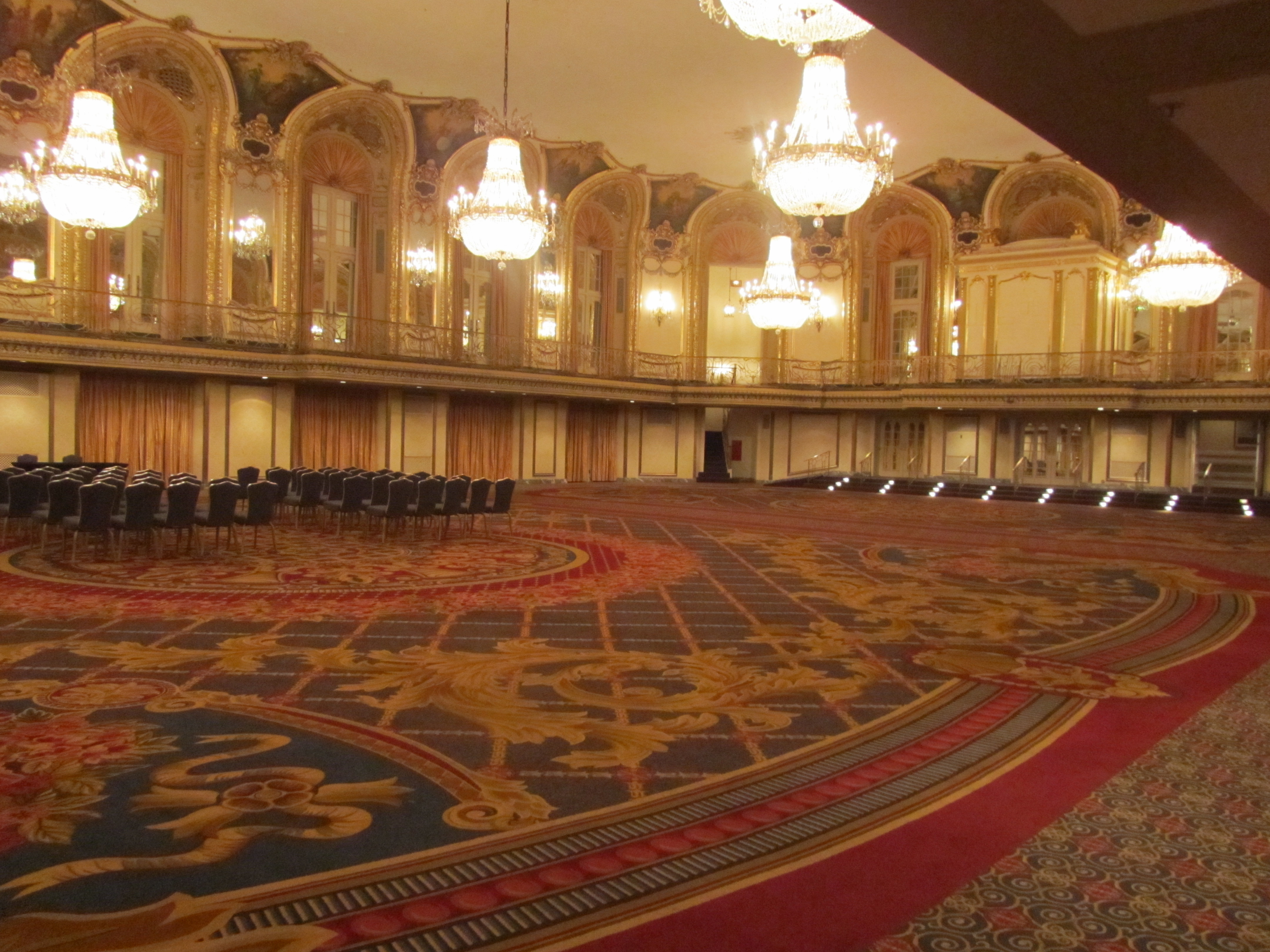
The ballroom at the Hilton Chicago Hotel, where Nichols unveils Provasic

Filming began in February 1993 and wrapped in mid-May. Filming locations included Bryson City and Dillsboro, North Carolina; Blount County, Tennessee; and Chicago. Although almost a third of the film is set in rural Illinois, a large portion of the principal filming was actually shot in Jackson County, North Carolina, in the Great Smoky Mountains.

The prison transport bus and freight train wreck scenes were filmed along the Great Smoky Mountains Railroad just outside their depot in Dillsboro; the wreckage can still be seen from the railroad's excursion trains. The train crash, which cost $1 million to film, was shot in a single take using a real train with a locomotive whose engine had been removed. The wreck took several weeks to plan, and was preceded by several test runs with a boxcar and a log car.

Scenes in the hospital after Richard Kimble initially escapes were filmed at Harris Regional Hospital in Sylva, North Carolina. Cheoah Dam in Deals Gap was the location of the scene in which Kimble jumps from the dam.

The rest of the film was shot in Chicago, including some of the dam scenes, which were filmed in the remains of the Chicago freight tunnels. The city hall stair chase (where Kimble narrowly escapes being apprehended by Gerard) was filmed in the corridors and lobby of Chicago City Hall. The character Sykes lives in the historic Pullman neighborhood of Chicago. Harrison Ford uses the pay phone in the Pullman Pub, and then climbs a ladder and runs down the roofline of the historic rowhouses. According to Andrew Davis, filming in Chicago was Ford's idea. "Originally, I wasn't even going to try to come to Chicago. I thought that the weather would be too cold and difficult for shooting. But Harrison, having seen several of my prior films shot in Chicago, suggested doing it here." Ford would later explain, "I grew up in Chicago, went to college in Wisconsin, and came back to take summer jobs for three years. I felt this was the best possible option as a location...We could get the grittiness, we could get the flash of architecture, the charm of the lake. It has it all." The chase scene during the St. Patrick's Day Parade was filmed during the actual parade held that year on Wednesday, March 17, 1993, with Mayor Richard M. Daley and Illinois Attorney General Roland Burris briefly seen as actual participants. Besides The Fugitive, another feature film, Michael Apted's Blink, was filmed during that year’s parade. According to Charles Geocaris, then head of the Chicago Film Office, both productions approached the film office in February about filming during the parade. Location managers and production managers for both films worked out the logistics with parade organizers, but according to Geocaris, the two camera crews still occasionally ran into each other during their shoots. Complicating matters was the cold weather, −6 °C (21 °F) with a windchill factor of −21 °C (−6 °F). Nevertheless, disruption was at a minimum, with Geocaris recalling, "people on the parade route were laughing as Tommy Lee Jones chased Harrison Ford...It was a fun thing for them."

Cinematographer Michael Chapman credits Andrew Davis for the film's distinctive use of Chicago, which drew much praise upon its release. "A lot of it really feels like Chicago, because it just has a native's eye to it. That's Andy's, not mine. He knew where to look." Chapman was hired a week into production after his predecessor was fired, and he claims he only took the job because the money was too good. Throughout the production, Chapman went back and forth between documentary and theatrical methods, using handheld cameras and natural light for scenes including the first house raid and then adding unexpected light sources throughout the tunnel chase, as the realistic absence of light was deemed unfeasible. Though his work was later recognized with an Academy Award nomination, Chapman said it was an unhappy experience, as he never got along with Davis. "I said, 'I hated being there' and 'I was the wrong guy' and cursed...but it all worked out, so you never know."

Much of the film was rewritten throughout production, and typically on the day each scene was supposed to shoot. According to Davis, he never met with credited screenwriter David Twohy, whose main contribution was writing the train crash. Beyond that, Davis said, "he wasn't involved in anything we did. Jeb Stuart was there with us...basically responding to things we were coming up with all the time...[Warner Bros.] can't talk about this because of the Writers Guild, but Tommy Lee Jones, myself, Harrison [Ford], and other people who were close with us, especially coming up with the whole plot about the pharmaceuticals, they were uncredited writers." Jane Lynch, who was cast as Dr. Kathy Wahlund in one of her first film roles, recalled having that experience, with both Harrison Ford and herself working out new dialogue for their scene right before they filmed it, as Harrison Ford "didn't like the scene as it was written." Julianne Moore originally had a larger role in the film which was significantly reduced in editing, as it was decided that a love interest for Kimble while he was pursuing his wife's killer was inappropriate and unworkable.

Given Harrison Ford's limited window of availability, Andrew Davis had only 10 weeks to edit, mix, and finish the film between the last day of shooting and the day it opened in theaters. To meet their schedule, producer Peter MacGregor-Scott set up seven editing suites at Warner Hollywood Studios, and had a team of editors cutting around the clock, as they each worked on different scenes. Each editor would be recognized for their work on the film with an Academy Award nomination.

== Music ==
James Newton Howard composed the film's musical score with the Hollywood Studio Symphony. The album was released through Elektra Records on August 31, 1993, while an expanded edition featuring the complete score was released by La-La Land Records later in 2009.

== Release ==
=== Home media ===
The film was released on VHS and Laserdisc on March 10, 1994, and on DVD in the United States on March 26, 1997. A special edition widescreen DVD was released four years later on June 5, 2001. The film generated $97 million in revenue from video rentals and was the most rented film in the United Kingdom in 1994.

In 2009, a repackaged variant was released. Special features on the DVD include behind-the-scenes documentaries, audio commentary by Tommy Lee Jones and director Andrew Davis, an introduction with the film's stars and creators, and the theatrical trailer.

The film was released on Blu-ray on September 26, 2006. Its special features include commentary by Tommy Lee Jones and director Andrew Davis, two documentaries, and the theatrical trailer. The audio and visual quality received negative reviews, with Blu-ray.com calling it "mostly abysmal". A 20th-anniversary Blu-ray edition was released on September 3, 2013, with a new transfer, along with DTS-HD Master Audio tracking among other features. Warner Bros. Home Entertainment remastered the film in 4K and released it on a 30th-anniversary Ultra-HD Blu-ray on November 21, 2023.

== Reception ==
=== Box office ===
The Fugitive opened strongly at the US box office, grossing $23,758,855 in its first weekend from 2,340 theaters, replacing Rising Sun as the number-one film, and surpassing Unforgiven as the biggest August opening weekend. For six years, the film held this record, until 1999, when it was surpassed by The Sixth Sense. It held the top spot for six weeks. The film eventually went on to gross an estimated $183,875,760 in the United States and Canada, and $185 million in foreign revenue, for a worldwide total of $368,875,760.

The Fugitive was the first major American film to be screened in the People's Republic of China in nearly a decade after a revenue-sharing agreement was made with China Film Import and Export Corporation, following restrictions on foreign films; First Blood (1982) was released there in 1985. The Fugitive grossed CN¥25.8 million ($3 million) in 1994, with Warner Bros. estimated to have received $400,000.

=== Critical response ===
On Rotten Tomatoes, The Fugitive has a 96% rating based on 81 reviews, with an average rating of 8.10/10. The website's critics consensus reads, "Exhilarating and intense, this high-impact chase thriller is a model of taut and efficient formula filmmaking, and it features Harrison Ford at his frantic best." On Metacritic the film has a weighted average score of 87 out of 100, based on 32 critics. Audiences surveyed by CinemaScore gave the film a rare "A+" grade on a scale of A+ to F.

Like the cult television series that inspired it, the film has a Kafkaesque view of the world. But it is larger and more encompassing than the series: Davis paints with bold visual strokes so that the movie rises above its action-film origins and becomes operatic.

— Roger Ebert, writing for the Chicago Sun-Times

Desson Howe, writing in The Washington Post, called the film "A juggernaut of exaggeration, momentum, and thrills—without a single lapse of subtlety—Fugitive is pure energy, a perfect orchestration of heroism, villainy, suspense, and comic relief. Ford makes the perfect rider for a project like this, with his hangdog-handsome everyman presence. He's one of us—but one of us at his personal best. It's great fun to ride along with him." Left impressed, Rita Kempley also writing in The Washington Post, surmised how the filmed contained "Beautifully matched adversaries", figuring, "One represents the law, the other justice—and it's the increasingly intimate relationship between them that provides the tension. Otherwise, 'The Fugitive' would be little more than one long chase scene, albeit a scorchingly paced and innovative one." In a mixed review, Marc Savlov of The Austin Chronicle wrote, "Director Davis valiantly tries to keep the breakneck, harried pace of an actual flight going throughout, and only occasionally drops the ball (the film's convoluted conspiracy ending is the first example to beat me about the face and neck just now—others will crop up after deadline, I'm sure)." Of the lead actor's performance, he said, "Ford may be the closest thing we have these days to a Gary Cooper, but really, where's David Janssen when we really need him?" Owen Gleiberman of Entertainment Weekly said that the film was about "two chases, two suspense plots running on parallel—and finally convergent—tracks. Kimble and Gerard spend the entire film on opposite sides of the law. Before long, though, we realize we're rooting for both of them; they're both protagonists, united in brains, dedication, superior gamesmanship. The film's breathless momentum springs from their jaunty competitive urgency." In a 2018 review for The Atlantic, Soraya Roberts says the film is "notable for being the best of a genre that no longer really exists: the character-driven Hollywood action movie for adults".

The film was not without its detractors. Geoff Andrew of Time Out viewed the film as "A glossy, formula chase movie with the requisite number of extravagant action sequences". The critic added, "Ford is up to par for the strenuous stuff, but falls short on the grief, anxiety, and compassion, allowing Tommy Lee Jones to walk away with the show as the wisecracking marshal on Kimble's trail." Columnist Ethan Ham writing for the Bright Lights Film Journal speculated that supporting actor Tommy Lee Jones' character was "much more disturbing than the inept police." Later explaining, "In Kimble's first encounter with Gerard, Kimble says, 'I didn't kill her!' Gerard responds, 'I don't care.'" In the Chicago Sun-Times, noted film critic Roger Ebert voiced his enthusiasm with the film observing, "The device of the film is to keep Kimble only a few steps ahead of his pursuers. It is a dangerous strategy, and could lead to laughable close calls and near-misses, but Davis tells the story of the pursuit so clearly on the tactical level that we can always understand why Kimble is only so far ahead, and no further. As always, Davis uses locations not simply as the place where action occurs, but as part of the reason for the action." Rating the film with three stars, James Berardinelli of ReelViews professed, "Following the opening scenes, we're treated to over a half-hour of nonstop action, as Gerard and his men track down Kimble. Directed and photographed with a flair, this part of the movie keeps viewers on the edges of their seats. Most importantly, when on the run, Kimble acts like an intelligent human being. Equally as refreshing, the lawmen are his match, not a bunch of uniformed dunces being run around in circles."

Harrison Ford, bearded and numb with grief, breathes new life into the role last played by the stoic David Janssen some 26 years ago. Janssen played Kimble as the Lone Ranger with a stethoscope, moving from town to town, but Ford takes a darker, more gothic approach.

— Rita Kempley, writing in The Washington Post

For the most part, satisfied with the quality of the motion picture, Jonathan Rosenbaum of the Chicago Reader said that "The mystery itself is fairly routine, but Jones's offbeat and streamlined performance as a proudly diffident investigator helps one overlook the mechanical crosscutting and various implausibilities, and director Andrew Davis does a better-than-average job with the action sequences." Leonard Klady writing in Variety exclaimed, "This is one film that doesn't stint on thrills and knows how to use them. It has a sympathetic lead, a stunning antagonist, state-of-the-art special effects, top-of-the-line craftsmanship and a taut screenplay that breathes life into familiar territory." Film critic Chris Hicks of the Deseret News accounted for the fact that the film "has holes in its plotting that are easy to pick apart and characters that are pretty thin, bolstered by the performances of seasoned vets who know how to lend heft to their roles." But in summary he stated, "the film is so stylish, so funny and so heart-stopping in its suspense that the audience simply doesn't care about flaws".

The February 2020 issue of New York Magazine lists The Fugitive as among "The Best Movies that Lost Best Picture at the Oscars."

In 2024, Looper ranked it number 47 on its list of the "50 Best PG-13 Movies of All Time," writing, "Sometimes, all you need to make a movie work is just some great chase scenes and a good suspenseful plot that keeps you guessing. Having Harrison Ford and Tommy Lee Jones on hand to provide the kinds of performances that they deliver best is just further icing on a cinematic cake ... The Fugitive is suspenseful, action-packed, and intelligent — the kind of film that critics and moviegoers can all agree on."

=== Accolades ===
The film was nominated and won several awards in 1993–1994. Various film critics included the film on their lists of the top 10 best films for that year; including Roger Ebert of the Chicago Sun-Times who named it the fourth best film of 1993.

Award	Category	Nominee	Result
1994 66th Academy Awards	Best Picture	Arnold Kopelson, producer	Nominated
1994 66th Academy Awards	Best Supporting Actor	Tommy Lee Jones	Won
1994 66th Academy Awards	Best Cinematography	Michael Chapman	Nominated
1994 66th Academy Awards	Best Film Editing	Dennis Virkler, David Finfer, Dean Goodhill, Don Brochu, Richard Nord and Dov Hoenig	Nominated
1994 66th Academy Awards	Best Original Score	James Newton Howard	Nominated
1994 66th Academy Awards	Best Sound	Donald O. Mitchell, Michael Herbick, Frank A. Montaño and Scott D. Smith	Nominated
1994 66th Academy Awards	Best Sound Effects Editing	John Leveque and Bruce Stambler	Nominated
1994 Annual ACE Eddie Awards	Best Edited Feature Film (Dramatic)	Dennis Virkler, Don Brochu, Dean Goodhill, Richard Nord, David Finfer	Nominated
1993 8th Annual ASC Awards	Theatrical Release	Michael Chapman	Nominated
1994 ASCAP Film & Television Music Awards	Top Box Office Films	James Newton Howard	Won
1994 Japan Academy Prize	Best Foreign Film		Nominated
1993 47th British Academy Film Awards	Sound	John Leveque, Bruce Stambler, Becky Sullivan, Scott D. Smith, Donald O. Mitchell, Michael Herbick, Frank A. Montaño	Won
1993 47th British Academy Film Awards	Actor in a Supporting Role	Tommy Lee Jones	Nominated
1993 47th British Academy Film Awards	Editing	Dennis Virkler, David Finfer, Dean Goodhill, Don Brochu, Richard Nord, Dov Hoenig	Nominated
1993 47th British Academy Film Awards	Achievement in Special Effects	William Mesa, Roy Arbogast	Nominated
1993 6th Annual Chicago Film Critics Awards	Best Picture		Nominated
1993 6th Annual Chicago Film Critics Awards	Best Director	Andrew Davis	Nominated
1993 6th Annual Chicago Film Critics Awards	Best Supporting Actor	Tommy Lee Jones	Nominated
1993 Cinema Audio Society Awards	Outstanding Achievement in Sound Mixing for a Feature Film	Donald O. Mitchell, Michael Herbick, Frank A. Montaño, Scott D. Smith	Won
Directors Guild of America Awards 1993	Outstanding Directorial Achievement	Andrew Davis	Nominated
1994 Edgar Awards	Best Motion Picture	Jeb Stuart, David Twohy	Nominated
1994 51st Golden Globe Awards	Best Director – Motion Picture	Andrew Davis	Nominated
1994 51st Golden Globe Awards	Best Performance by an Actor in a Motion Picture – Drama	Harrison Ford	Nominated
1994 51st Golden Globe Awards	Best Performance by an Actor In A Supporting Role in a Motion Picture	Tommy Lee Jones	Won
Kansas City Film Critics Circle Awards 1993	Best Supporting Actor	Tommy Lee Jones	Won
19th Annual Los Angeles Film Critics Association Awards 1993	Best Supporting Actor	Tommy Lee Jones	Won
1994 MTV Movie Awards	Best Movie		Nominated
1994 MTV Movie Awards	Best Male Performance	Harrison Ford	Nominated
1994 MTV Movie Awards	Best On-Screen Duo	Harrison Ford, Tommy Lee Jones	Won
1994 MTV Movie Awards	Best Action Sequence	Train Wreck	Won
National Society of Film Critics Awards 1993	Best Supporting Actor	Tommy Lee Jones	Nominated
Southeastern Film Critics Association Awards 1993	Best Supporting Actor	Tommy Lee Jones	Won
1994 Writers Guild of America Award	Best Adapted Screenplay	Jeb Stuart, David Twohy	Nominated

American Film Institute Lists

- AFI's 100 Years...100 Thrills – #33

== Novelization ==
Jeanne Kalogridis wrote a mass-market paperback novelization of the film.

== Sequel ==
Jones returned as Gerard in a 1998 sequel, U.S. Marshals. It also incorporates Gerard's team hunting an escaped fugitive, but does not involve Harrison Ford as Kimble or the events of the initial 1993 feature, although the hospital Kimble worked at is mentioned.

== Remakes ==
The movie was remade in India in Telugu and Hindi in 1994/1995 as Criminal and in 1995 as Nirnayam in Malayalam. While the central theme of the movie remained the same, some details were altered to suit the local set up. In November 2019, it was announced that Brian Tucker would serve as a screenwriter on a remake of The Fugitive.

A 2-part TV mini-series, Tōbōsha (逃亡者), was broadcast on TV Asahi December 5 and 6, 2020. It stars Ken Watanabe as Dr. Kazuki Kakurai in a plot that closely follows the 1993 film.

== See also ==
- Wrongfully Accused
