= Roy Huggins =

American writer (1914–2002)

- Born: July 18, 1914; Littell, Washington, U.S.
- Died: April 3, 2002 (aged 87); Santa Monica, California, U.S.
- Other names: Thomas Fitzroy; John Thomas James; John Francis O'Mara
- Occupation: Writer
- Years active: 1940s–1990s
- Notable work: Maverick; 77 Sunset Strip; The Fugitive; The Rockford Files
- Spouses: Bonnie Porter (1938–1952; 2 children); Adele Mara (1952–2002; his death; 3 children)
- Children: 5

Roy Huggins (July 18, 1914 – April 3, 2002) was an American novelist and an influential writer/creator and producer of character-driven television series, including Maverick, The Fugitive, Hunter, and The Rockford Files. He became a noted writer and producer using his own name, but much of his later television scriptwriting was done using the pseudonyms Thomas Fitzroy, John Thomas James or John Francis O'Mara.

== Early life ==
Huggins was educated at the University of California, Los Angeles, 1935–1941, where he was a Ph.D. student in political science until the outbreak of World War II.

== Career ==
=== Civil servant ===
After graduation, he worked as a special representative of the U.S. Civil Service from 1941 to 1943, and later as an industrial engineer from 1943 to 1946.

=== Writer ===
Huggins' novels include The Double Take (1946), Too Late for Tears (1947), and Lovely Lady, Pity Me (1949).

When Columbia Pictures purchased the rights to Huggins's novel The Double Take in 1948, Huggins signed a contract with the studio to adapt the script into the movie I Love Trouble. From here he entered the movie industry, working as a contract writer at Columbia and RKO Pictures. In 1952, he wrote and directed the film Hangman's Knot, a Randolph Scott Western.

Huggins was a member of the Communist Party USA until the Nazi-Soviet Non-Aggression Pact of 1939. In 1952, he appeared before the House Un-American Activities Committee and named 19 former comrades who had already been named, and three—Elliott Grenard, Leslie Edgley, and Val Burton—who had not.

A staff writer at Columbia until 1955, Huggins moved to television in April 1955, when Warner Bros. hired him as a producer. He is best known as the creator of long-running shows such as Maverick with James Garner, 77 Sunset Strip with Efrem Zimbalist Jr., and The Fugitive with David Janssen, all on ABC.

Huggins left Warner Bros. and in October 1960 became the vice president in charge of television production at 20th Century-Fox. Once Huggins moved into an executive role, he generally used pseudonyms on stories or teleplays he created for episodic television, usually only taking credit under his real name for producing or creating a show.

In the early 1960s, when writing for TV, Huggins alternated between the pseudonyms Thomas Fitzroy and John Francis O'Mara, generally maintaining a policy of using one pseudonym and then the other, in strict rotation from one script to the next. These pen names were partly derived from the names of the eldest two sons from his second marriage (to Adele Mara).

In the 1961–1962 season, Huggins produced Bus Stop, an ABC drama based loosely on William Inge's play of the same name, with Marilyn Maxwell in the role of Grace Sherwood, owner of the bus station and diner in the fictional town of Sunrise, Colorado.

In 1962, Huggins took a job as a vice president in the television division at Universal (then known as Revue Studios), where he spent the next 18 years. At Universal, he co-created The Rockford Files starring James Garner and produced The Virginian, Alias Smith and Jones, and Baretta, among other series. Beginning in the late 1960s, Huggins phased out his other pen names and began using the pseudonym John Thomas James for virtually all of his television scriptwriting, usually on the shows he was producing. The name was a composite of the names of all three of his sons from his second marriage. In 1966, he formed Public Arts, Inc., and started a joint venture with Universal to produce their television projects. In the early 1980s, he became an independent producer, eventually signing a deal with Columbia Pictures Television in 1983.

Huggins worked in TV through the 1980s, and served for three years as the executive producer of Hunter. Stephen J. Cannell said of Huggins' time on Hunter: "Roy was in the driver's seat where he belonged. Nobody does it better or with more style...Roy Huggins is my Godfather, my Hero and my Friend. They don't come any better."

==== The Huggins contract ====
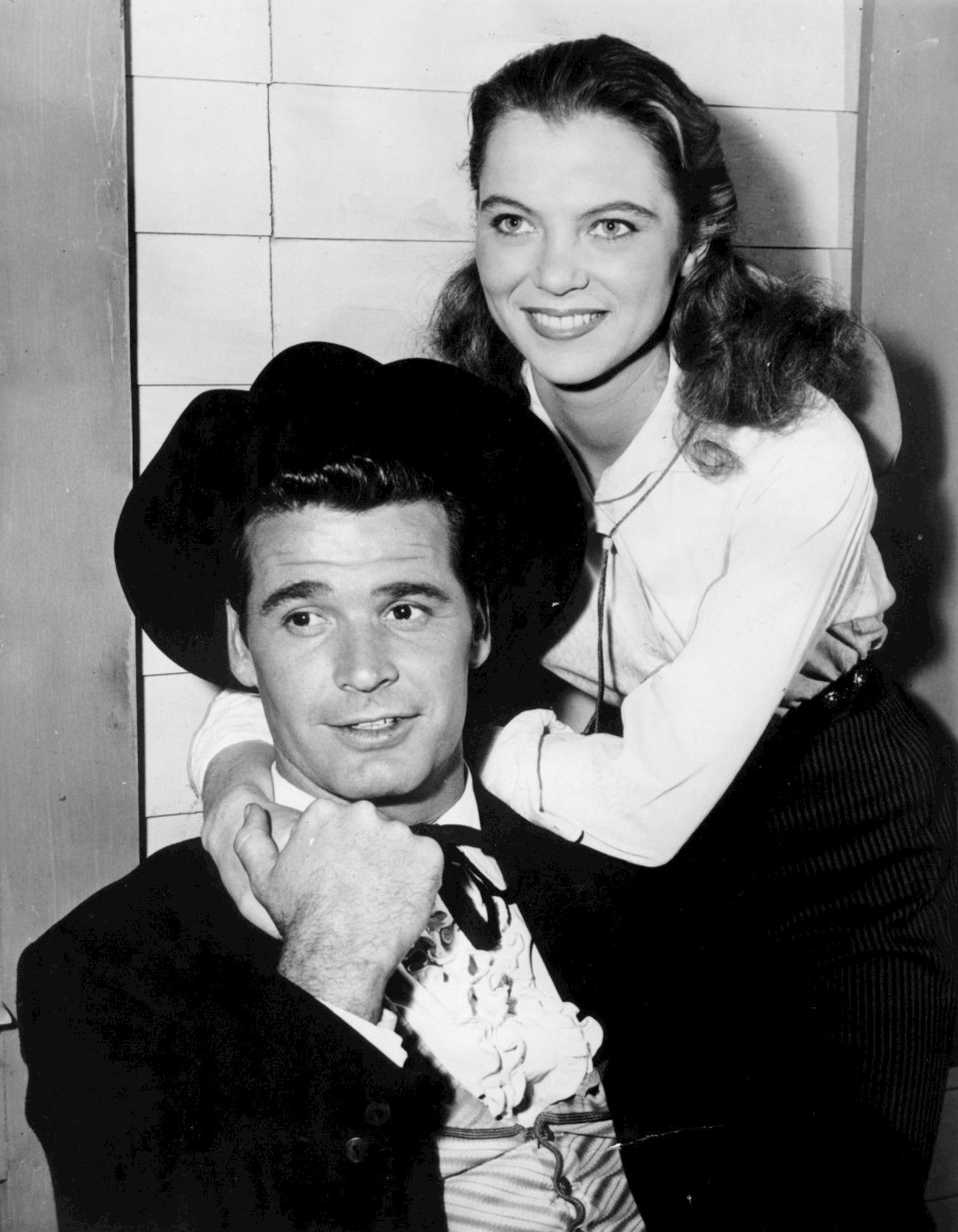
James Garner as Huggins's Maverick with Louise Fletcher

At Warner Bros. Television, Huggins was repeatedly denied credit and compensation as the creator of several television programs. A Warner-owned property was used as the basis of the script for the first broadcast episode of Maverick, substituted for the actual pilot, which was run second to cheat Huggins out of his creator residuals. In another example, Jack L. Warner deliberately had the pilot to 77 Sunset Strip, entitled Girl on the Run, screened briefly at movie theaters in the Caribbean to legally establish that the television series derived from a film, rather than, as was actually the case, several books and novellas Huggins had written in the 1940s. These and other similar incidents led Huggins to leave the studio soon thereafter.

The experiences led Huggins to demand increasing rights and ownership of all television concepts he authored. By the mid-1960s, he had distilled this demand into a boiler plate for all his contracts.

"I was getting paid my royalty and my fee whether I did the show or not. If I conceived the show, and got it on the air, anyone could produce it and I would still get paid just as if I was doing it . . . That became known as 'the Huggins contract'. Every producer in television would say, 'I want the Huggins contract', and some of them got it."

He used the "Huggins contract" for his television series The Fugitive, thereby limiting the rights of United Artists Television to his material. This automatically permitted his financial participation in the 1993 film version of his creation decades later. He was given character credit for the follow-up film U.S. Marshals (1998).

== Personal life ==
Huggins was married to artist Bonnie Porter and later to actress Adele Mara.
