= Man on Fire =

Man on Fire may refer to:

== Film and television ==
- Man on Fire (1957 film), a film starring Bing Crosby and Inger Stevens
- Man on Fire (1987 film), a film starring Scott Glenn, based on the Quinnell novel
- Man on Fire (2004 film), a film starring Denzel Washington, based on the Quinnell novel
- Man on Fire (TV series), a TV series starring Yahya Abdul-Mateen II, based on the Quinnell novel
- Man on Fire (2018 film), a documentary about Charles Moore's self-immolation
- "Man on Fire" (The Vampire Diaries), an episode of The Vampire Diaries
- "Man on Fire", an episode of Hawaii Five-O
- "Man on Fire", an episode of NCIS: New Orleans

== Literature ==
- Man on Fire (Kelman novel), a 2015 novel by Stephen Kelman
- Man on Fire (Quinnell novel), a 1980 thriller by A. J. Quinnell
- Man on Fire, a novel by Bruce Douglas Reeves published by Jove Books
- Man on Fire: The Life and Spirit of Norbert of Xanten, a 2019 biography by Thomas Kunkel

== Music ==
- Man on Fire, a 2005 mixtape album by Chamillionaire
- Man on Fire, a 2008 album by Sean Slaughter
- "Man on Fire", a 1987 song by Andy Gibb
- "Man on Fire", a 2014 song by Bury Tomorrow from Runes
- "Man on Fire", a 2018 song by DNCE from People to People
- "Man on Fire", a 2016 song by Earl St. Clair
- "Man on Fire", a 2012 song by Edward Sharpe and the Magnetic Zeros from Here
- "Man on Fire", a 1984 song by Roger Taylor from Strange Frontier
- "Man on Fire", a 2021 song by Volumes from Happier?

== Other uses ==
- Man on Fire, a sculpture by Luis Jiménez

== See also ==
- Nippulanti Manishi (disambiguation) (lit. 'Man of Fire'), various Indian films
