= Man on Fire (TV series) =

2026 American TV series

- Release poster
- Genre: Action thriller
- Created by: Kyle Killen
- Based on: Man on Fire by A. J. Quinnell
- Showrunner: Kyle Killen
- Written by: Kyle Killen
- Starring: Yahya Abdul-Mateen II; Billie Boullet; Scoot McNairy; Alice Braga
- Music by: Max Aruj
- Country of origin: United States
- Original languages: English; Portuguese
- No. of seasons: 1
- No. of episodes: 7

Production
- Executive producers: Kyle Killen; Scott Pennington; Arnon Milchan; Yariv Milchan; Natalie Lehmann; Peter Chernin; Jenno Topping; Tracey Cook; Steven Caple Jr.; Michael Polaire; Edward L. McDonnell; Yahya Abdul-Mateen II; Stacy Perskie
- Cinematography: Alejandro Martínez; Paula Huidobro
- Editors: Marta Evry; Brian Beal; Todd Desrosiers; Paul Harb
- Running time: 42–59 minutes
- Production companies: New Regency Productions; Chernin Entertainment; Chapter Eleven; Grey Skies Pictures

Original release
- Network: Netflix
- Release: April 30, 2026

Man on Fire is an American action thriller television series loosely based on the 1980 novel by A. J. Quinnell. Originally set in Italy/Malta by Quinnell, this series takes place in modern-day Rio De Janeiro, Brazil. Kyle Killen is the showrunner and an executive producer of the series, which stars Yahya Abdul-Mateen II as an ex-mercenary out for revenge.

The series consists of seven episodes and was released on Netflix on April 30, 2026. It received generally positive reviews from critics.

== Premise ==
John Creasy is a former U.S. Army Special Forces Captain, who after leaving the military did contract work for the CIA. On his last assignment in Mexico City, his entire team was ambushed and killed. Four years later, Creasy is suffering from PTSD, drinks heavily and works in a warehouse. After a suicide attempt, his friend Rayburn recruits him to a security assignment in Brazil. Shortly after arriving in country, a bomb detonates killing Rayburn and his entire family with the exception of their daughter Poe. Creasy then embarks on a revenge spree against the people who committed the bombing leading him to uncover a major conspiracy.

== Cast ==
=== Main ===
- Yahya Abdul-Mateen II as John Creasy, a former U.S. Army Special Forces Captain
- Billie Boullet as Poe Rayburn, Paul's eldest daughter
- Scoot McNairy as Henry Tappan, Senior Officer at the CIA
- Alice Braga as Valeria Melo, a professional driver who becomes Creasy's friend and confidant

=== Special Guest ===
- Bobby Cannavale as Paul Rayburn, Creasy's friend, and a former U.S. Army officer

=== Recurring ===
- Paul Ben-Victor as Moncrief, Director of the CIA
- Billy Blanco Jr as João Carmo, the President of Brazil
- Thomás Aquino as Prado Soares, Head of Security for Carmo
- Ismael Caneppele as Osmar
- Iago Xavier as Vico
- Jefferson Baptista as Livro
- Bruno Suzano as Beto
- Alex Ozerov-Meyer as Ivan
- Ravel Cabral as Emanuel Ferraz
- Elzio Vieira as Tiago

== Episodes ==
No.	Title	Directed by	Written by	Original release date
1	"One"	Steven Caple Jr.	Kyle Killen	April 30, 2026
John Creasy, a former US Army Special Forces Captain, leads private security jobs for the CIA. During an operation in Mexico City, Creasy’s entire team is killed. Four years later, Creasy remains affected by PTSD and attempts suicide. Paul Rayburn, his friend, offers Creasy work with his private security company in Rio de Janeiro to help him recover. Arriving in the city, Creasy stays with Rayburn and his family, including his rebellious teenage daughter, Poe. Rayburn’s company is contracted to provide security for luxury condos, built as part of a redevelopment plan by Brazilian President Carmo, who is running for re-election. Soares, Carmo’s head of security, fears the condos are targets of the FRP, a terrorist group wanting to sabotage Carmo’s campaign. Soares is unimpressed with Creasy but agrees to hire him on Rayburn’s recommendation. Creasy struggles to adjust back to working life and bonds with Poe, who feels homesick. Creasy also bonds with driver Valeria after getting drunk at a bar and brutally fending off two muggers. On the same night, Poe sneaks out to a party and returns home just as a bomb destroys her family’s condominium. Rayburn, the rest of his family, and approximately 600 others are killed. Creasy goes to Poe, who the Brazilian authorities want to detain as a witness. He negotiates a deal with Carmo and Soares for Poe’s testimony in exchange for her return to the US and his protection. Creasy also vows to hunt down Rayburn’s killers.
2	"Two"	Steven Caple Jr.	Kyle Killen	April 30, 2026
En route to Poe giving her testimony, Creasy averts a planned attack on their convoy. Arriving at an air base, Creasy agrees to remain in Brazil and work with Soares, who wants an outsider involved as he is suspicious of leaks to the terrorists from within the Brazilian security forces. News coverage discusses how the bombing has given the President a huge jump in the pre-election polls. Creasy interviews Poe, extracting key details about the bombers' transport. However, just as Poe gets on a jet to fly back to the US, the air base is attacked. Creasy fights off the attackers and saves Poe’s life. He also kidnaps Tiago, the sole surviving attacker. Creasy contacts both Valeria and Henry Tappan, his former CIA handler, for help protecting Poe. Valeria takes Creasy and Poe off-grid, hiding them within her favela. Creasy interrogates Tiago, discovering that the air base attackers were gang members hired by Osmar, a leader of the FRP. President Carmo contacts CIA Director Moncrief and Tappan, expressing concern at Creasy going rogue. Moncrief assures Carmo that the CIA is prepared to ‘neutralise’ Creasy if necessary.
3	"Three"	Vicente Amorim	Kyle Killen	April 30, 2026
Creasy fakes his and Poe’s deaths as part of a plan to get Tiago access to Osmar’s hideout for payment. Needing to return to her family, Valeria entrusts Poe’s care to Beto, her cousin and a local gang member. Beto, in turn, forces Livro, his bookish younger brother, to take on the task. Livro and Poe bond, but are shaken when Vico, a rival of Beto’s, intimidates them with his men. At Osmar’s hideout, Tiago resists, forcing Creasy to kill him. Osmar narrowly escapes, but Creasy contacts him through a burner phone intended for Tiago. Realising he is being tracked, he decides to go after Osmar. Creasy ignores Poe’s pleas to return after the incident with Vico and ahead of a planned extraction by CIA plane, organised by Tappan. After Creasy accidentally dropped her business card when retrieving the burner, Osmar’s men identify Valeria and force her at gunpoint to take them to Poe in the favela. Meanwhile, Creasy stows away in Osmar’s car and breaks into his home, accessing the bedroom of his young son.
4	"Four"	Vicente Amorim	Kyle Killen	April 30, 2026
Creasy uses Osmar’s son to lure him and his wife into their panic room to take the whole family hostage. Creasy interrogates, manipulates and tortures Osmar into revealing details about the bomb attack, including the names of his co-conspirators. Creasy sends this intelligence to Tappan at Langley. Osmar reveals his true name, Gabriel Estevas, and that he works directly for FRP leader Emmanuel Ferraz, but insists he does not know the identity of motorcyclist Poe saw on the night of the bombing. He does reveal that the conspirators have Creasy and Poe’s addresses in the US, in case the attack at the airport failed. In the favela, Valeria arrives with Gabriel’s men, but she manages to warn the gang about the threat. The gang kills one of the two enforcers, allowing Valeria to escape. The surviving enforcer runs into a fleeing Poe, taking her and Livro hostage. He contacts Gabriel in the panic room, and the threat to Poe causes Creasy to have a PTSD attack. When he recovers, though, he arranges a hostage exchange between Beto and Vico’s gang and Gabriel’s men, exchanging Poe and Livro for Gabriel and his family. Moncrief passes the intelligence to Carmo and Soares, who order a series of raids to apprehend the conspirators Gabriel named. Gabriel commits suicide before he’s arrested. With the threat from the man on the motorcycle still present, Creasy takes Poe, Valeria and her daughter away from the city. Tappan tells Moncrief he is heading to Brazil to help Creasy, but Ferraz contacts him, revealing Tappan as part of the conspiracy.
5	"Five"	Clare Kilner	Kyle Killen	April 30, 2026
Creasy takes Poe, Melo and her daughter Marina to a hotel and checks into multiple other hotels around Rio to muddy the trail for their pursuers. He also contacts Ivan, an old associate, to arrange safe passage for the three women to Portugal. Creasy also asks Ivan for help breaking into the prison where Ferraz is being held, believing Ferraz has more answers about the conspiracy. Tappen arrives in Rio and contacts Creasy under the guise of being an ally. Creasy refuses his help, forcing Tappen to investigate each of the hotels where Creasy has booked into. He narrowly misses an opportunity to murder Creasy and Poe before they leave their actual hotel. In the favela, Creasy and Valeria pay Beto for his protection services, but the favela boss, Duda, splits the money with Vico. An upset Beto disowns Livro while Melo recruits Vico for the mission, as he used to smuggle drugs into the prison. This initially angers Creasy, but when Ivan is unable to find a route inside, Vico provides one instead. Guilty over failing to help his dead sister escape the favela, Vico also decides to help Livro by stealing Beto's half of the money and giving it to Livro to start a new life. Creasy successfully breaks into the prison, but Tappan uncovers Creasy's uniform from hotel CCTV footage, prompting him to warn Ferraz and have the prison put on lockdown just as Creasy gets inside.
6	"Six"	Clare Kilner	Kyle Killen	April 30, 2026
Creasy starts a prison riot and kidnaps Ferraz from his cell to interrogate. Ferraz reveals he has been framed by Carmo and Soares, who are threatening his family. They want to use the terrorist attack to win the election and retain sweeping emergency powers to rule Brazil unimpeded. Ferraz also divulges Tappan’s involvement and offers to lead Creasy to a series of recordings providing evidence, in exchange for aiding his escape and letting the FRP save his family. Creasy agrees after Poe confirms from an image of Tappan that he was the motorcyclist. Tappan releases the names of Creasy, Valeria, Marina and Livro to the media as bombing co-conspirators, while Soares and his men raid the prison to hunt down Creasy. Ivan, Vico, Valeria and Livro enable Creasy’s escape by faking a bomb threat. However, Ferraz decides to stay behind to stall Soares and ensure his family’s safety. He also reveals he lied about the recordings to get Creasy to help. Meanwhile, Beto, seeking the reward money put out for Creasy and the others, tips off the government about their safehouse location. Tappan leads a raid to capture Poe, but she narrowly escapes with Marina. They reunite with Creasy and the others, and Creasy resolves to give himself up to bring down the conspiracy.
7	"Seven"	Michael Cuesta	Kyle Killen	April 30, 2026
Creasy reveals that Tappan procures blackmail material on hostile figures he works with, as an insurance policy to ensure his own safety. He concocts a plan to assassinate Tappan so his evidence against Soares and Carmo is released. After Soares murders Ferraz when his family is taken to safety, Soares and Tappan learn of his ‘recordings’, which are part of Creasy’s plan to lure Tappan into the open. However, a tip-off during the operation forces Creasy and his group to flee. Vico stays behind to be arrested so he can testify to the story and further convince Soares and Tappan. They recover the recording, which is actually a fake biohazard threat, forcing their evacuation to a hospital, where Creasy’s group lie in wait. Poe distracts security to allow Creasy to strike against Tappan while Ivan, Valeria, Livro and an escaped Vico help Poe flee the security forces. Creasy fatally wounds Tappan and saves Poe and the others. However, an irate Soares takes Poe hostage and wounds Creasy, who still manages to kill him. In the aftermath, Carmo is exposed and arrested while Valeria and Marina return home. Livro and Vico join Ivan’s crew, and Creasy and Poe go to Los Angeles to bury the Rayburns. Director Moncrief calls Creasy, offering him a chance to track down the people who killed his team in Mexico City. Creasy accepts.

== Production ==
=== Development ===
Netflix ordered a new adaptation of Man on Fire by A. J. Quinnell in March 2023 from New Regency Productions and Chernin Entertainment. After having been previously adapted for film in 1987 and in 2004, this adaptation would be a television series that would also adapt the follow-up novel The Perfect Kill. Series creator Kyle Killen was hired as the showrunner and writer while also serving as an executive producer.

=== Casting ===
Yahya Abdul-Mateen II was cast as the lead in June 2024, and Steven Caple Jr. was hired to direct the first two episodes. Both of them joined the series as executive producers alongside Arnon Milchan, Yariv Milchan, Natalie Lehmann, Peter Chernin, Jenno Topping, Tracey Cook, Scott Pennington, Ed McDonnell, Michael Polaire, and Stacy Perskie. Additional cast members were announced through October 2024, including Billie Boullet, Bobby Cannavale, Alice Braga, Scoot McNairy, and Paul Ben-Victor.

=== Filming ===
The series was shot in Mexico City where Abdul-Mateen was injured on set, forcing a brief production pause. Max Aruj composed the score for the series.

== Release ==
Man on Fire was released on Netflix on April 30, 2026.

== Reception ==
The review aggregator website Rotten Tomatoes reported a 59% approval rating based on 37 critic reviews. The website's critics consensus reads: "Man on Fire mostly punches above its weight in a television adaptation that touches on new emotional and action-packed heights, despite its narrative pitfalls, thanks to the devoted and unflinching performance by Yahya Abdul-Mateen II." Metacritic, which uses a weighted average, gave a score of 61 out of 100 based on 21 critics, indicating "generally favorable" reviews.

== See also ==
- Man on Fire, released in 1987.
- Man on Fire, released in 2004, directed by Tony Scott and starring Denzel Washington.
- Ek Ajnabee, a Hindi-language adaptation directed by Apoorva Lakhia and starring Amitabh Bachchan.
- Aanai, a Tamil-language adaptation, directed by Selvaa and featuring Arjun Sarja.
