= Christopher Little =

English literary agent (1941–2021)

Christopher John Little
- Born: 1941; York
- Died: 2021 (aged 79–80)
- Occupation: literary agent

Christopher John Little (1941 – 7 January 2021) was an English literary agent, most famous for representing J.K. Rowling from 1995 to 2011.

== Early life and career ==
Little was born in York in 1941, and grew up in Liversedge. His father, Bernard, flew Spitfires for the Royal Air Force in the Battle of Britain during World War II and became an officer of the Order of the British Empire. He later became a coroner. His mother, Nancy (Pickersgill) Little, was a secretary. Little left school at 16 to work for his uncle’s textile firm. He later worked for another textile company in France, and then moved to Southeast Asia, where he worked in sales. He returned to London in 1974, and founded the recruiting firm Christopher Little Consultants.

The recruitment firm grew, but it was sold in 1992 after Little's literary agency started representing about 20 authors and became his main business.

== Career as a literary agent ==
Little established the Christopher Little Literary Agency in 1979 after successfully promoting the book Man on Fire. In 1994 he represented Anna Pasternak, author of Princess in Love, about Diana, Princess of Wales.

In 1995, J.K. Rowling sent Little the first three chapters of Harry Potter and the Philosopher's Stone after choosing him from a list of literary agents. Ultimately, his agency was responsible for negotiating initial publishing of Harry Potter series with Bloomsbury Publishing.

In 2011, Rowling switched to a new agent, Neil Blair, the copyright lawyer from Little’s firm. Little threatened to sue, but he backed off after Rowling paid him £10 million.

== Personal life ==
Little's first marriage was to Linda Frewen in 1975. They had two children and divorced in 1987. He married his second wife, Gilly, in 2012.

Little died from cancer on 7 January 2021, at age 79 at his home in London.

== Legacy ==
J.K. Rowling after his death said in a statement: “Christopher Little was the first person in the publishing industry to believe in me. Being taken on by his agency was a huge break for an unknown writer. He represented me throughout the 10 years I published Harry Potter and, in doing so, changed my life”.

Darren Shan wrote: “If Chris believed in you, he remained loyal to you and supported you to the best of his ability.”
