= Christopher Little Literary Agency =

Firm of literary agents in London, England

Christopher Little Literary Agency was a literary agency in London. It closed in 2021 following the death of its founder, Christopher Little. Its clients included Darren Shan, A. J. Quinnell, Cathy Hopkins, and Wladyslaw Szpilman. The agency managed J. K. Rowling, author of the Harry Potter series, from 1995 until 2011.

== History ==
=== Christopher Little ===
Christopher John Little was born in 1941, in York, England. His father served in the Royal Air Force during World War II, later becoming a coroner. His mother was a secretary.

Little opened a recruiting firm after returning to the United Kingdom following negotiation work abroad. In 1979, he sold his first novel, Man on Fire, written by his childhood friend Phillip Nicholson under the pseudonym A. J. Quinnell. The same year he established the Christopher Little Literary Agency. By 1992, the literary agency represented 20 authors and he shut down his recruiting business.

Little died from cancer on 7 January 2021. The Christopher Little Literary Agency permanently closed after his death.

=== J. K. Rowling ===
In 1995, Little received the first three chapters of J. K. Rowling's manuscript for Harry Potter and the Philosopher's Stone. According to reports, J. K. Rowling chose Christopher Little's agency due to the perceived suitability of his name for a children's book. Although Christopher Little initially dismissed the submission, his office manager reportedly encouraged him to reconsider it. Little persuaded Bloomsbury Publishing, which had recently opened a children's department, to publish it.

In 1996, Bloomsbury Publishing bought the UK Commonwealth publication rights for one Harry Potter book for £2,500. The U.S. rights were sold at auction for a six-figure sum. Foreign language publication rights were subsequently sold in over 80 languages. By July 2007, Christopher Little was reported to have earned at least £50m from the Harry Potter franchise.

In 2011, J. K. Rowling parted ways with Little and signed with his former business partner Neil Blair. Little considered legal action against Rowling, but the dispute was settled out of court.

=== Other authors ===
The Christopher Little Literary Agency primarily represented authors in commercial fiction. Some of these authors include Anne Zouroudi, Erin Kinsley, and Janet Gleeson. The company represented General Sir Mike Jackson for the autobiography Soldier and Kate McCann for Madeleine: Our Daughter's Disappearance and the Continuing Search for Her, a book about the disappearance of Madeleine McCann. Little also secured film deals for his clients, including Man on Fire (A. J. Quinnell), The Lazarus Child (Robert Mawson), The Pianist (Wladyslaw Szpilman), The Vampire’s Assistant (Darren Shan), and the Harry Potter films (J. K. Rowling).
