= Meir Doron =

Israeli writer and journalist (born 1954)

- מאיר דורון
- Born: 26 November 1954 (age 71); Rehovot, Israel
- Occupations: Journalist, Editor, Author, Screenwriter
- Years active: 1974–present
- Awards: Prix Italia; Won: Best Film; 1986 Bread

Meir Doron (Hebrew: מאיר דורון; born November 26, 1954) is an Israeli editor, journalist and publisher, and is the author of several books and award-winning screenplays.

== Biography ==
Meir Doron was born in Rehovot. During the Yom Kippur War of October 1973, he served in a combat unit along the Suez Canal. He was a communications specialist in the armored personnel carrier of battalion commander Ehud Barak, later Israel's prime minister and defense minister. Doron is married with two children.

== Media career ==
Doron has published over 2,000 articles, interviews, investigative reports and commentaries in a variety of Hebrew-language media in Israel and the US. He began his career as an investigative Journalist for HaOlam HaZeh, a leading weekly in Israel at the time, edited by Israeli journalist Uri Avneri. Doron rose to the position of editor of the entertainment section of La'isha, an Israeli weekly magazine, and as the editor of the Israel Defense Forces magazine B'MAhane Nahal. He has served as the editor in chief of Los Angeles–based Hebrew publications Hadashot LA, Shalom LA, and Shavuah Israeli over a period of fifteen years. He is the publisher and editor of Israeli Life USA, bringing news and information to Israeli-Americans, and the publisher of LA Health News.

Doron co-wrote four full-length screenplays. Bread, directed by Ram Loevy was awarded the Prix Italia 1986 as the best full length TV-film of that year, and was broadcast in the United States on PBS. In 1988 Doron co-wrote Meshakeem Bahoref (Winter Games). In 1989, he co-wrote the original Israeli feature film Helem Krav (Shell Shock), distributed in the US by Sony Pictures Entertainment. His 1990 film Parents & Sons was awarded the Silver Lion (the Israeli Emmy) as best TV-Drama of that year. Doron is a regular lecturer on Hebrew literature at UCLA.

Doron has written three books. From The Heart (2007) is a saga documenting the eighty-year journey of a family from Iraq at the beginning of the 20th century, to United States today. He co-wrote Rebel With a Cause – the story of an urban partisan during World War II, which exclusively documents a number of untold heroic acts by Raoul Wallenberg (2010). He also co-wrote with Joseph Gelman Confidential, the biography of Hollywood producer Arnon Milchan. On July 17, 2011, The New York Times featured the book Confidential in its global business section.

== See also ==
- Media in Israel
