= Grand Saline, Texas =

- City
- Grand Saline Salt Palace

- Location of Grand Saline, Texas
- Coordinates: 32°40′39″N 95°42′41″W
- Country: United States
- State: Texas
- County: Van Zandt

Area
  - Total: 2.12 sq mi (5.48 km^{2})
  - Land: 2.10 sq mi (5.43 km^{2})
  - Water: 0.019 sq mi (0.05 km^{2})
- Elevation: 417 ft (127 m)

Population (2020)
  - Total: 3,107
  - Density: 1,480/sq mi (572/km^{2})
- Time zone: UTC-6 (Central (CST))
  - Summer (DST): UTC-5 (CDT)
- ZIP code: 75140
- Area codes: 903, 430 Phone prefix: 962|913
- FIPS code: 48-30476
- GNIS feature ID: 2410633
- Website: grandsalinetx.gov

Grand Saline is a city in Van Zandt County, Texas, United States. Its population was 3,107 as of 2020, making Grand Saline the third-largest city in Van Zandt County. The city is located roughly 75 miles (120 km) east of Dallas and 35 miles (56 km) northwest of Tyler, the two nearest metropolitan areas, and is part of the greater Tyler/Longview area.

The town derives its name from the large salt deposits located southeast of the city, the majority of which are owned by Morton Salt.

== History ==
Grand Saline's first settlers were the ancient Caddo and Cherokee Indian tribes, who discovered and made use of a large salt prairie south of the town. The Native Americans used evaporated salt, from the brine stream that flows over the flats, as a commodity they traded for other needed goods. In the mid-19th century, the tribes moved southeast, having been forced out of the area by Mirabeau B. Lamar, second president of the Republic of Texas, and by general anti-Indian sentiment. Only a few years after the Indians left the salt prairie behind, a new group of settlers arrived. A settler named John Jordan and other newcomers brought their families and set up a primitive salt works. The community named Jordan's Saline quickly became the center of Van Zandt County and was, for a while, the county seat.

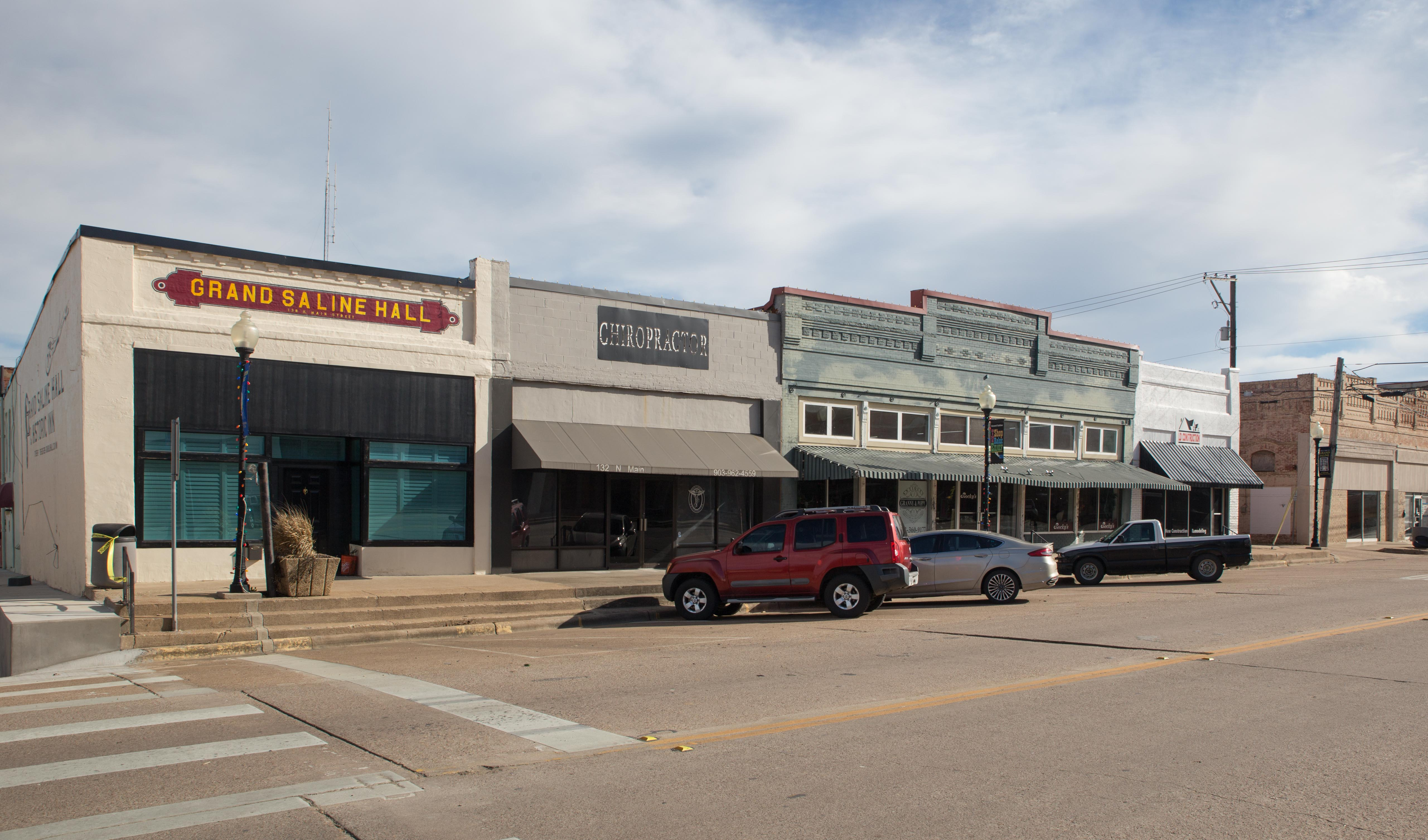
Downtown Grand Saline

The salt produced here was used in the process of tanning leather and preserving foodstuffs. Following the American Civil War, the Texas and Pacific Railroad was extended from Marshall to Dallas. A parcel of land was donated to the railroad, a depot was built, and the stop was named Grand Saline. The City of Grand Saline was incorporated in 1895 and the community of Jordan's Saline faded into history as its residents moved north to the bustling new city.

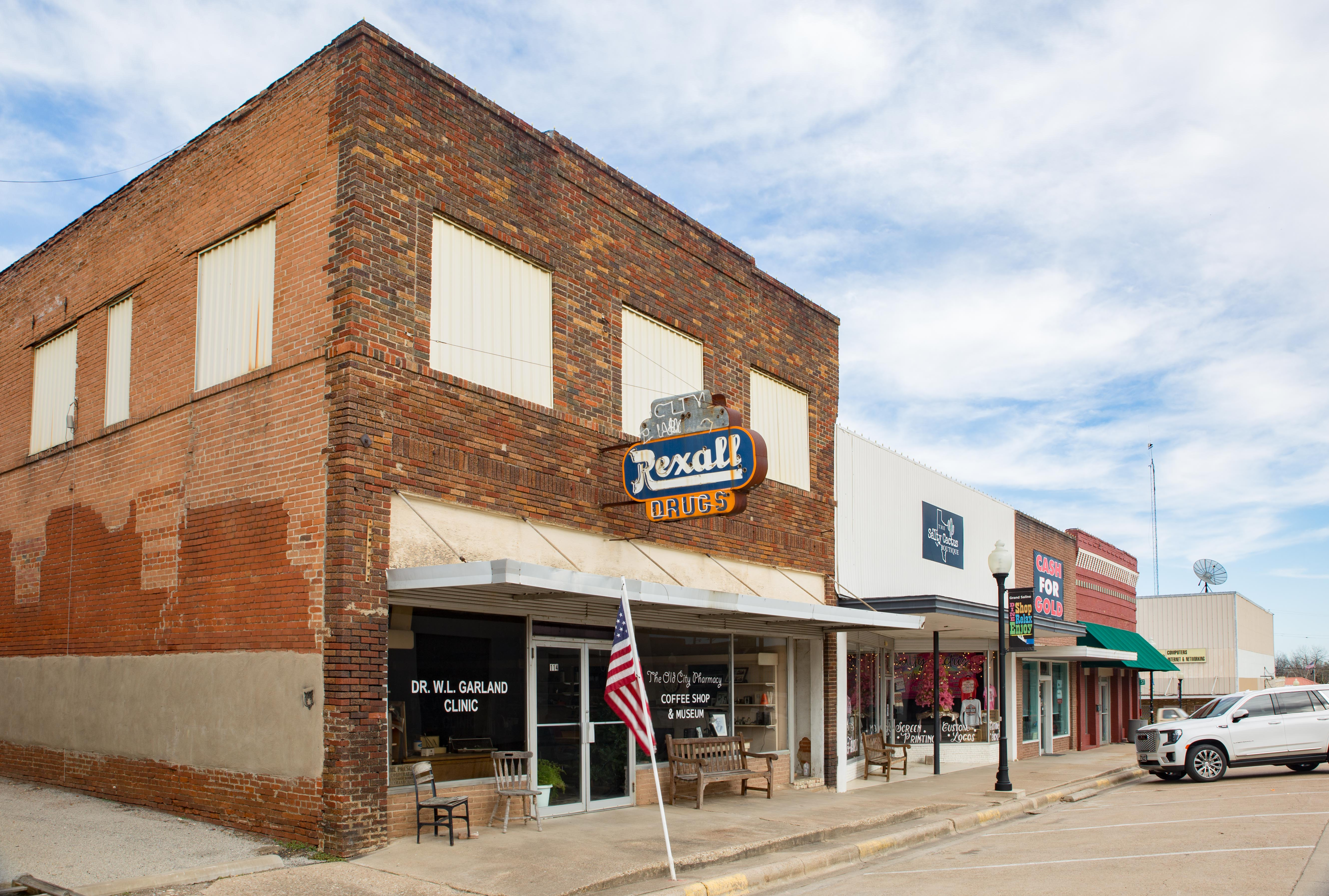
Rexall Drug Store and Coffee Shop in downtown Grand Saline

Numerous salt companies formerly were in Grand Saline, including the Richardson Salt works, which had drilled the first salt well; the Lone Star Salt Company; Kleer Salt Works, the first steam-powered salt plant; and the Grand Saline Salt Company, which later became part of the Morton Salt Company. During the late 1920s, the discovery of the nearby Van oil field brought companies that provided needed supplies. In the 1930s, Grand Saline had 12 petroleum supply companies and five lumber companies. In the Depression years, local sewing rooms made garments for the poor. During World War II, a workers' strike at Morton Salt led the town to form the Grand Saline Industrial Foundation to attract new business to town. Their efforts produced clothing manufacturers, sulfur processing, and meat packing companies. Grand Saline was also known for its Lone Star Hotel, which was for a brief time the home of Hollywood starlet Louise Fazenda, the wife of Warner Bros. executive Hal Wallis. Agriculture - farming and ranching - have long been a major part of the economic life in Grand Saline. Crops have included sweet potatoes and other truck crops. A cotton gin built south of town in 1890 marked the beginning of many years of cotton production. Poultry, livestock, dairy products, lumber, and ice production all played a role in the formation and history of the town.

== Geography ==
Grand Saline is located in northeastern Van Zandt County, at the intersection of Texas State Highway 110 and U.S. Route 80 in western East Texas. According to the United States Census Bureau, the city has a total area of 2.0 square miles (5.2 km^{2} or 1280 acres), of which 6.4 acres (0.5%) are covered by water.

== Topography ==
Grand Saline is located in the East Central Texas forests ecoregion. Its rural scenery is a mix of rolling hills and open pastures. The area around it is home to numerous creeks, streams, and areas of hardwood timber. The town is located in the Sabine River Valley as the river flows just north of the city and then bends south to flow under U.S. Route 80, east of Grand Saline.

== Transportation ==
Grand Saline is served by these roadways:

- US 80: Signed as Garland Street in the city, it runs east toward the Longview/Marshall area and to the Louisiana state line, and west to the Dallas/Ft. Worth Metroplex .
- SH 110: Grand Saline is located at the northern end of the highway. It is the main and preferred route from the Van/Grand Saline area into Tyler. North of the intersection of 110 and US 80, the highway bears the name Chris Tomlin Boulevard, in honor of the Contemporary Christian musician, who is a Grand Saline native.)
- FM 17 runs south to Canton, Texas, and north to Lake Fork.
- FM 857: Grand Saline serves as the northern end. It runs south into Smith County.

Grand Saline is also roughly 15 minutes north of Interstate 20.

== Education ==
Grand Saline is served by the Grand Saline Independent School District. College students who reside in the district are served by Tyler Junior College, as Grand Saline ISD is in the TJC taxing and service district.

== Demographics ==
Historical population
Census	Pop.	Note	%±
1910	1,065		—
1920	1,528		43.5%
1930	1,799		17.7%
1940	1,641		−8.8%
1950	1,810		10.3%
1960	2,006		10.8%
1970	2,257		12.5%
1980	2,709		20.0%
1990	2,630		−2.9%
2000	3,028		15.1%
2010	3,136		3.6%
2020	3,107		−0.9%
U.S. Decennial Census

=== 2020 census ===
As of the 2020 census, 3,107 people, 1,100 households, and 727 families were residing in the city. The median age was 37.4 years; 27.2% of the residents were under 18 and 20.1% were 65 or older. For every 100 females, there were 88.9 males, and for every 100 females 18 and over, there were 88.2 males 18 and over.

None of the residents lived in urban areas, while 100.0% lived in rural areas.

Of the 1,100 households in Grand Saline, 37.1% had children under 18 living in them, 45.1% were married-couple households, 18.6% were households with a male householder and no spouse or partner present, and 30.4% were households with a female householder and no spouse or partner present. About 29.1% of all households were made up of individuals, and 16.1% had someone living alone who was 65 or older.

The city had 1,229 housing units, of which 10.5% were vacant. The homeowner vacancy rate was 1.7% and the rental vacancy rate was 9.5%.

Racial composition as of the 2020 census
Race	Number	Percentage
White	2,382	76.7%
Black or African American	17	0.5%
American Indian and Alaska Native	18	0.6%
Asian	6	0.2%
Native Hawaiian and other Pacific Islander	1	0.0%
Some other race	414	13.3%
Two or more races	269	8.7%
Hispanic or Latino (of any race)	737	23.7%

== Media ==
Grand Saline has two local newspapers, the Grand Saline Sun and the Van Zandt News, which are published weekly and cover local news; it also has daily newspapers delivered to residents such as The Dallas Morning News and the Tyler Morning Telegraph. Grand Saline residents can receive television channels and radio stations from the Dallas/Ft. Worth and Tyler/Longview media markets.

== Healthcare ==
Until 2019, Grand Saline operated Texas General Hospital-Van Zandt, a level 4 trauma emergency room hospital, with 52 beds that opened in April 2015 in the same building as the former Cozby-Germany Hospital. The city also is home to three assisted-living centers, and provides EMS services and an ambulance station. The hospital has been permanently closed since August 2019.

== Notable people ==
- Charles R. Moore, Methodist minister, human-rights activist, and subject of the 2018 documentary film Man on Fire, about his 2014 self-immolation in Grand Saline
- Chris Tomlin, award-winning Christian singer/songwriter

== Photo gallery ==
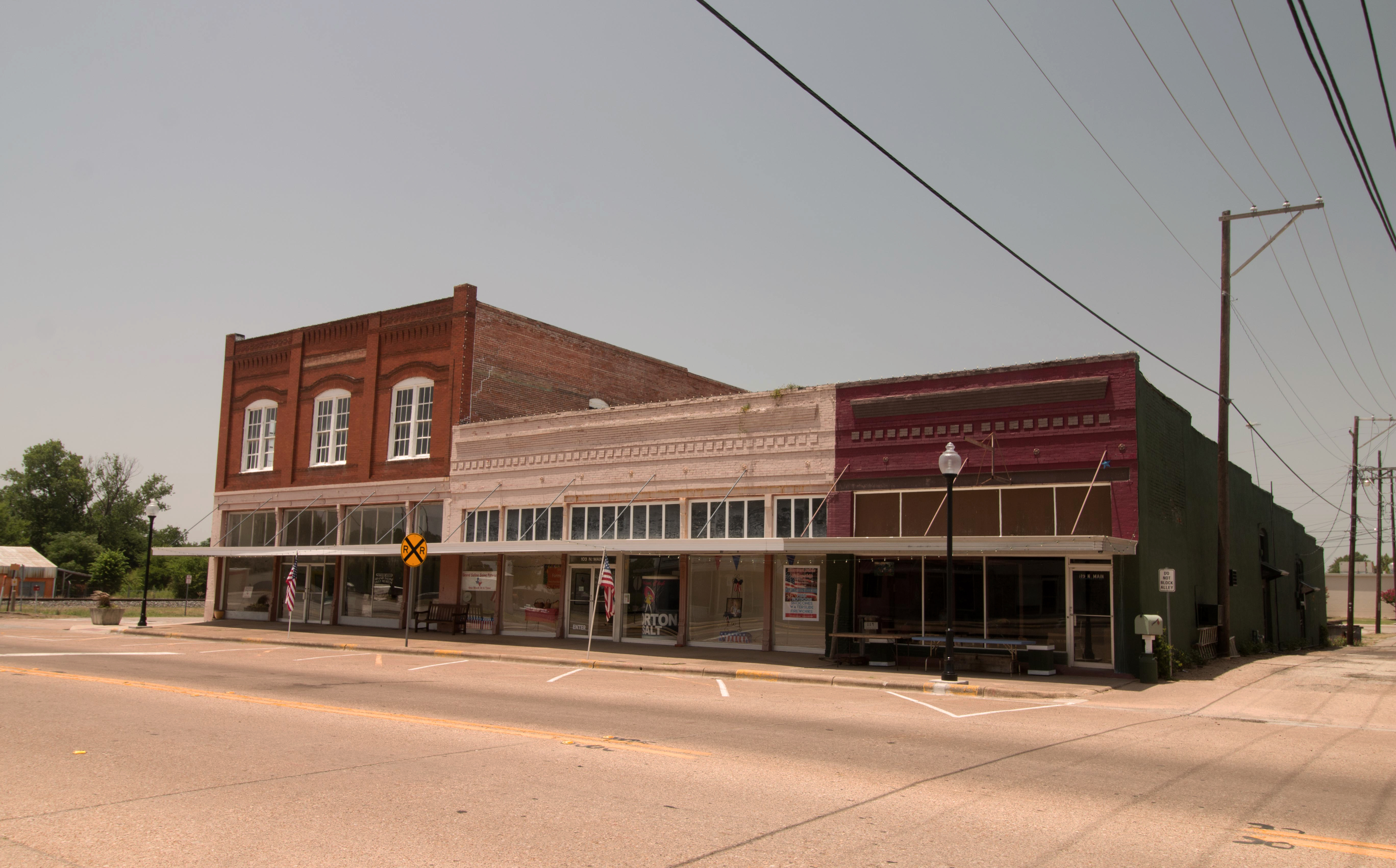
Downtown Grand Saline

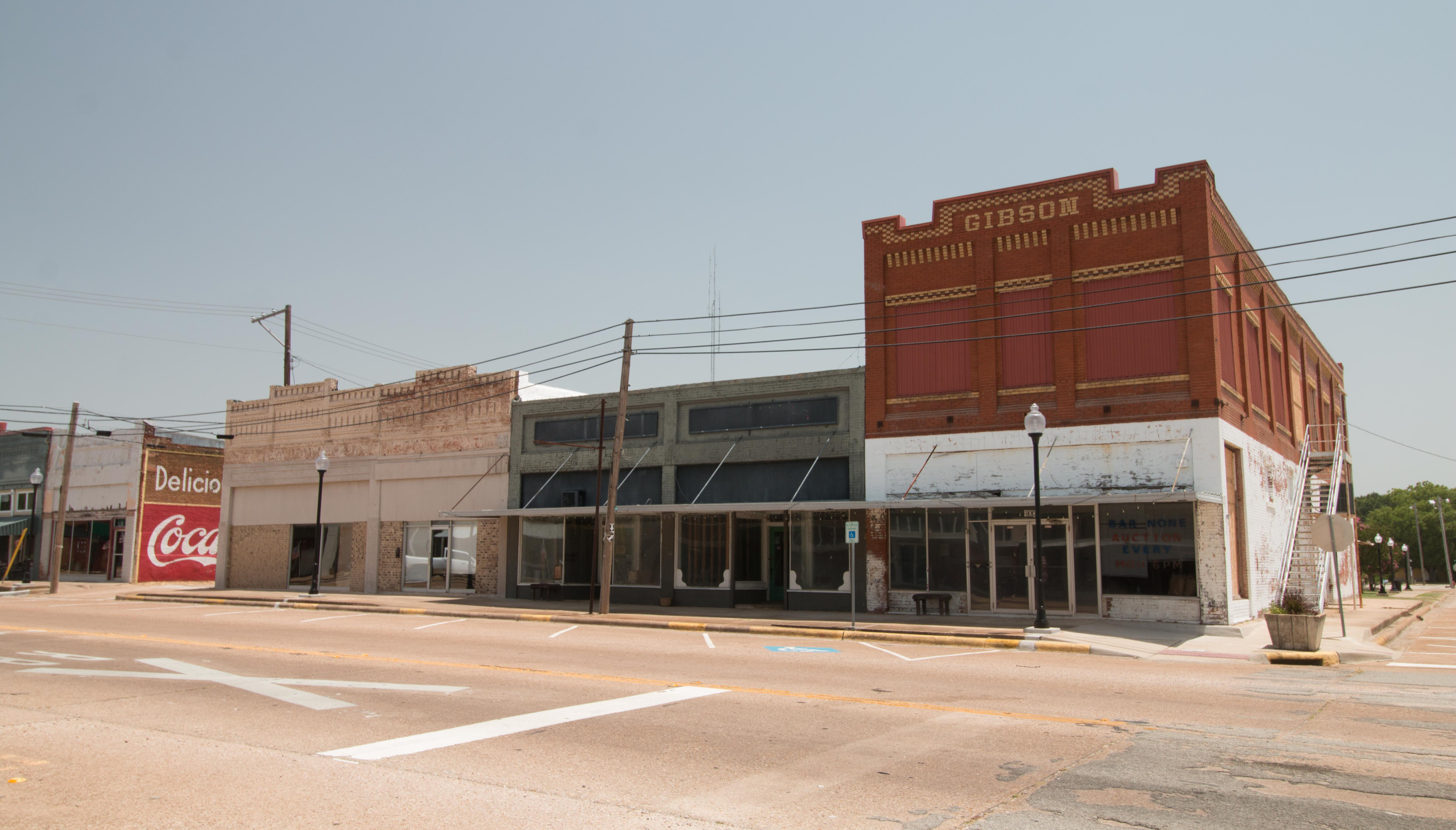
Downtown Grand Saline

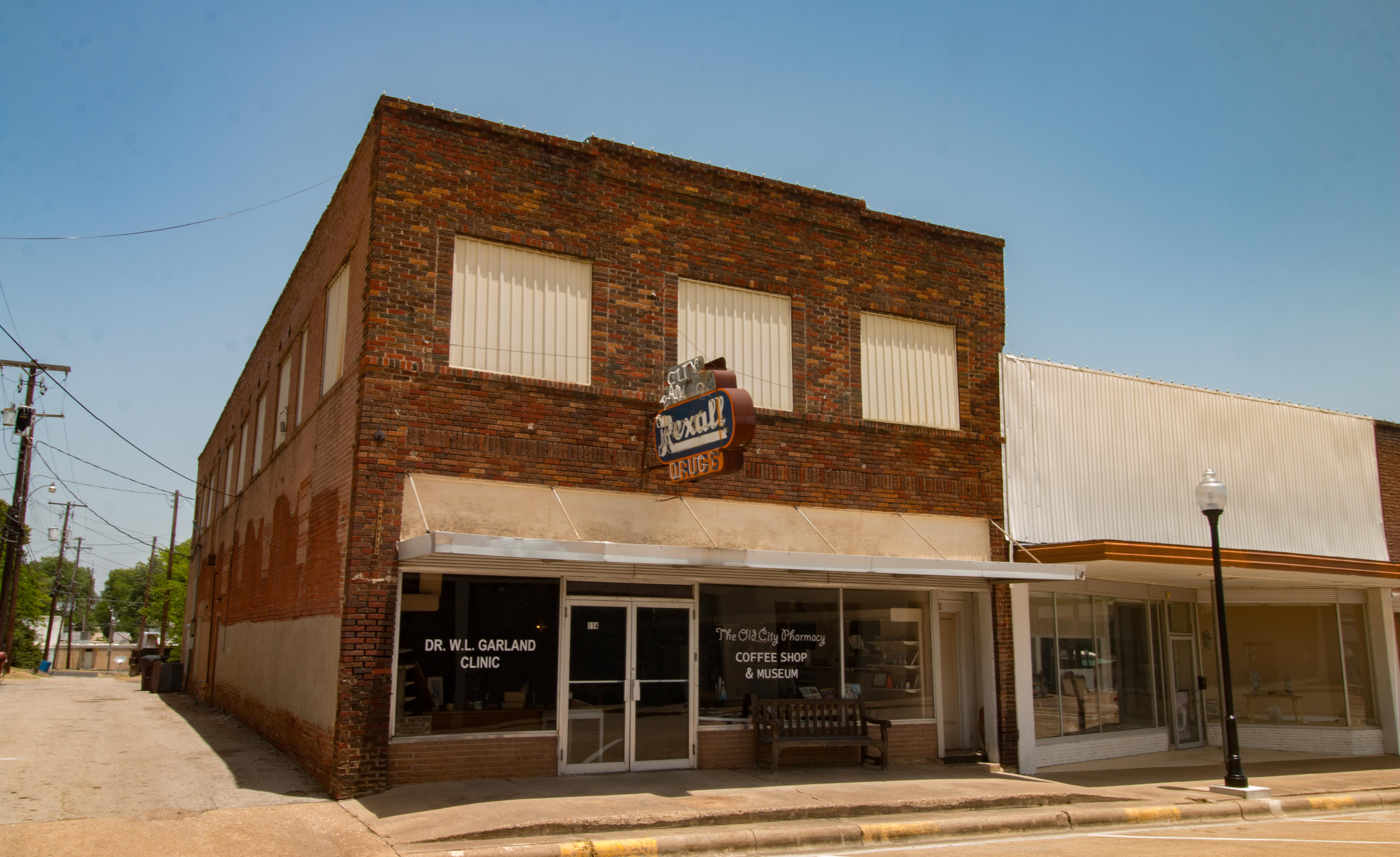
Rexall Drug Store

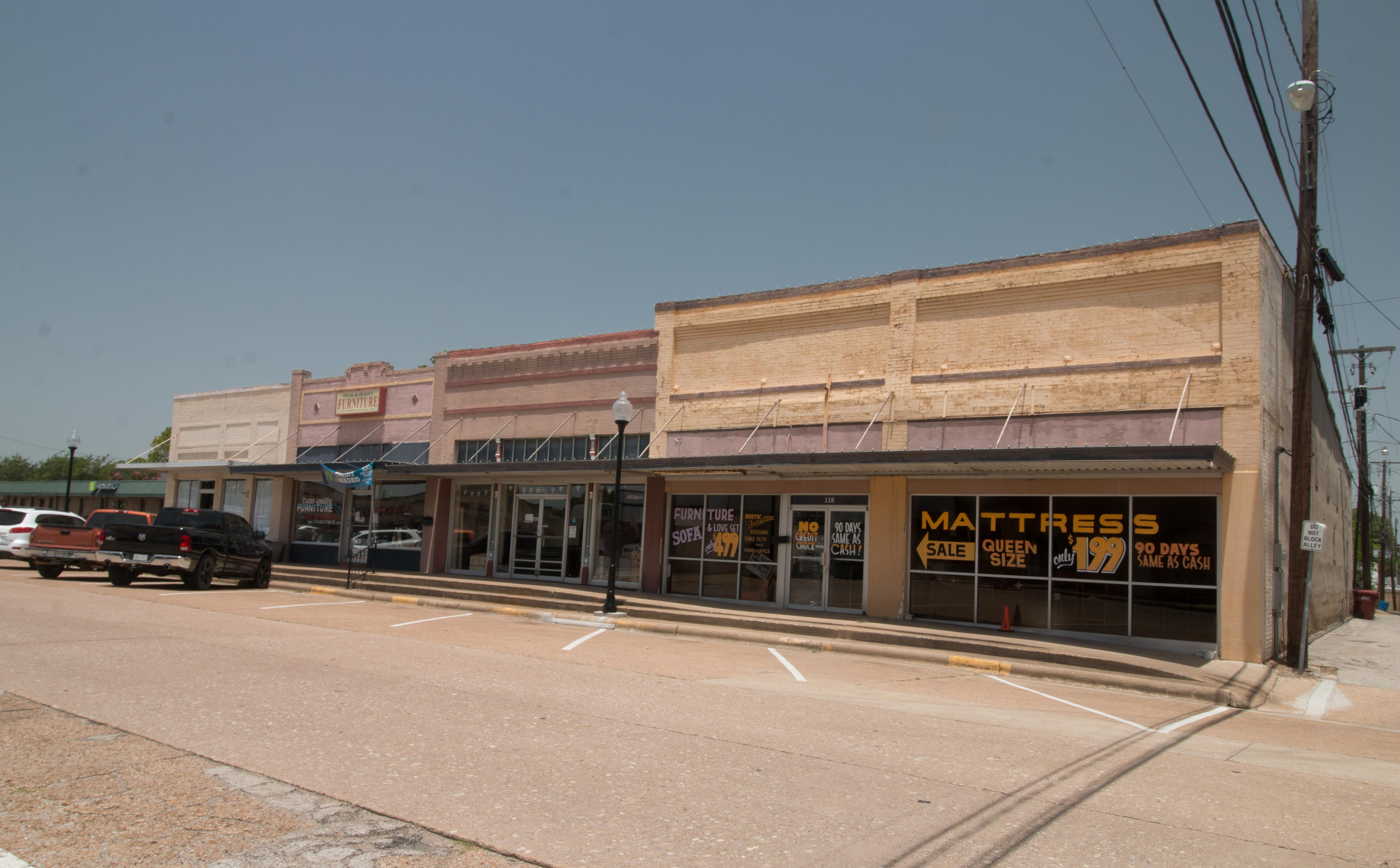
Downtown Grand Saline
