= Bread (1986 film) =

- Hebrew: לחם
- Written by: Gilad Evron, Meir Doron.
- Directed by: Ram Loevy
- Country of origin: Israel
- Original language: Hebrew

Production
- Running time: 84 minutes

Original release
- Release: July 1986

Bread (Hebrew: לחם, tr. Lehem) is an 84-minute 1986 Israeli Hebrew-language Prix Italia-winning independent underground dramatic television art film directed by Ram Loevy and cowritten with Gilad Evron and Meir Doron.

== Synopsis ==
The film follows Shlomo Elmaliach (Rami Danon), who loses his job at his town's local bakery when it is forced to close. Rather than join the other unemployed protesters, Elmaliach locks himself in his own home and launches a very personal hunger strike. At first, people come to visit him at his home, and there is even a rumor that television reporters might show up (quickly dismissed by Elmaliach's friend Zaguri, played by Avner Dan, who states that “they only come when there is a ruckus”). Gradually, even Elmaliach's friends abandon him, and he ends up dragging his own family down with him. A son, Baruch (Moshe Ivgy), seeks radical solutions to poverty, while a daughter, Navah (Etti Ankri, who also sings), who has escaped to Tel Aviv-Yafo to study, returns to her home and takes on a job on a production line, and Elmaliach's wife, Mazal (Rivka Bahar), takes on a job as a seamstress. At the end of the film, the factory is reopened as a result of all of the protests, however, by then it is too late for Shlomo Elmaliach. The film was produced by the Israel Broadcasting Authority, was broadcast on Channel 1, features music composed by Nahum Nardi to lyrics written by Nathan Alterman (plus the 1984 song I Just Called to Say I Love You by Stevie Wonder), and stars inter alia Shmil Ben Ari, Jonathan Cherchi, Rita Shukrun, and Reuven Dayan.

== Reception ==
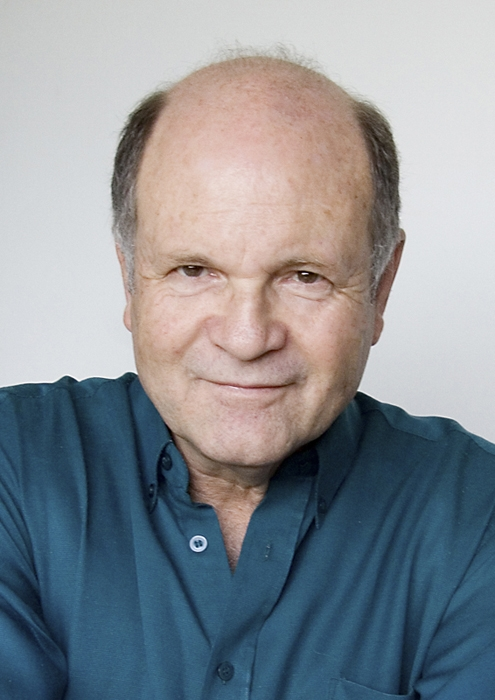
Ram Loevy (October 2005)

The journalist Uri Klein has compared the film to the works of Alain Resnais, Chris Marker, Agnès Varda, and Michelangelo Antonioni and has opined that it “is still very powerful, and it seems as relevant today as it was on the day it was first aired.” All five films were released in Israel as part of a limited edition DVD boxset in 2009.
