= Nippulanti Manishi =

Nippulanti Manishi (lit. 'Man of Fire') may refer to:

- Nippulanti Manishi (1974 film), an Indian Telugu-language action film
- Nippulanti Manishi (1986 film), an Indian Telugu-language action film

== See also ==
- Man on Fire (disambiguation)
