= Charles R. Moore (minister) =

American minister and activist (1934–2014)

Charles Robert Moore

Personal details
- Born: July 18, 1934 Grand Saline, Texas, U.S.
- Died: June 23, 2014 (aged 79) Grand Saline, Texas, U.S.

Charles Robert Moore (July 18, 1934 – June 23, 2014) was an American Methodist minister and anti-racist activist. Moore drew attention to himself when he immolated himself in the East Texas town of Grand Saline, an event that became the subject of the 2018 documentary Man on Fire. He also drew attention to how the United Methodist Church (UMC) treated gays and lesbians by going on a hunger strike years earlier. He had aligned himself with several progressive, liberal and left-leaning causes throughout his life, leaving behind a typed letter urging the community of Grand Saline and the United States to repent for its racism.

== Biography ==
Moore was born on July 18, 1934, near Grand Saline, Texas, and grew up in a town he described as a stronghold of the Ku Klux Klan (KKK) that was blighted by racial discrimination. At age 10, he was deeply affected by accounts of people of color who had been brutally decapitated and had their heads placed on poles. Moore graduated from Tyler Junior College in 1954, then earned a B.A. degree from Southern Methodist University (SMU) in 1956 and a B.D. from Perkins School of Theology at SMU in 1956. He served in various Texas churches from 1953 until 1965 when he began post doctorate studies at Harvard Divinity School and Boston University. In the mid-1960s, he moved to Chicago and began working for the Ecumenical Institute. This work took him to Africa, Brussels, India, and the Middle East. In 1990, Moore led Grace Methodist church in Austin, Texas, where he opened the doors to gays and lesbians.

== Protests ==
While serving in San Antonio in 1972, Moore organized a meeting of Methodists to bring attention to what he saw as the injustice of the Vietnam War. When the United Methodist bishops held a worldwide meeting in Austin in 1995, Moore's 15-day hunger strike ended only after the bishops acknowledged their role in contributing to stigma and ostracism of gays and lesbians. Moore helped organize the Texas Coalition to Abolish the Death Penalty (TCADP), which operates as a resource for those opposed to capital punishment. In 2000 he received awards from Parents and Friends of Lesbians and Gays (PFLAG) and TCADP.

== Death ==
On June 23, 2014, Moore drove from his home in the Dallas suburb of Allen, Texas, to Grand Saline, about 75 miles east of Dallas. He parked his car in a shopping center parking lot on the far eastern part of the city. He then proceeded to pour gasoline on himself and set himself ablaze. Bystanders retrieved a store fire extinguisher and put out the blaze. He was taken by helicopter to Parkland Hospital in Dallas, and died there later that night.

Moore left a typed note on his car stating he was born in Grand Saline and grew up around racial discrimination. The note explained that his act was a protest of what he saw as Grand Saline's long-standing racist culture. He said that the Grand Saline community shunned blacks and resorted to violence, including hangings, burnings, and decapitations. Declaring himself heartbroken, he lamented that America and Grand Saline had never really repented for the atrocities of slavery.

Moore himself predicted that some would judge him insane. His papers and personal notes were released to the media, revealing his thinking and intentions. In the weeks leading up to his death, he wrote that his mental and physical health were good, but he was frustrated that he had been unable to bring about the social change he felt was so urgent. In the notes, Moore sometimes criticizes himself harshly for not acting more decisively on social justice issues. He wanted the act of his death to get more people to care about gay rights, the death penalty, civil rights, and racism.

Initially he had planned his self-immolation on the SMU campus on June 19, the annual Juneteenth commemoration, because of the decision by SMU to house the George W. Bush Presidential Center. He changed his mind and went to Grand Saline four days later to carry out his plan. After reading Moore's notes, family members concluded that his final act was an extension of his lifelong commitment to social justice.

An in-depth article in Texas Monthly examining Moore's death quoted family members, "He wanted his death to count for something".
