= The Mahdi (novel) =

1981 novel by Philip Nicholson, under the pen name A. J. Quinnell

- First US edition
- Author: Philip Nicholson, writing as A. J. Quinnell
- Language: English
- Genre: Thriller
- Publisher: Macmillan (UK); William Morrow & Co (US)
- Publication date: 1981 (UK); 1982 (US)
- Publication place: United States
- Media type: Print (Hardback & Paperback)
- Pages: 397 pgs (Hardcover)
- ISBN: 0688006469
- OCLC: 9736123

The Mahdi is a 1981 thriller novel by Philip Nicholson, writing as A. J. Quinnell. The book was published in 1981 by Macmillan in the UK then in January 1982 by William Morrow & Co in the US and deals with political power struggles over a presumed Muslim prophet.

== Synopsis ==
The Mahdi follows several characters as they attempt to find a way to negate the threat of Muslim fundamentalism to the Western World's oil supply. Pritchard, a slick triple agent, has been tapped to help solve the problem. He proposes that they find the Mahdi, a prophet that has been prophesied to follow Muhammad, and attempt to control him, as control over the Mahdi would give them control over the Muslim world.

== Reception ==
Kirkus Reviews stated that the work is "deft, swift, ingenious entertainment" to an audience desiring "twisty and whimsical" spy stories, while also being implausible. Anatole Broyard wrote that implausibility and "sheer sloppiness" characterise the book. Elizabeth Jakab of The New York Times gave The Mahdi an overall positive review, calling the plot "elegant" while stating that the lack of a defined villain makes it seem as if there were "less at stake here than there ought to be".
