= Man on Fire (2004 film) =

2004 film by Tony Scott

- Theatrical release poster
- Directed by: Tony Scott
- Screenplay by: Brian Helgeland
- Based on: Man on Fire (1980 novel) by A. J. Quinnell
- Produced by: Lucas Foster; Arnon Milchan; Tony Scott
- Starring: Denzel Washington; Dakota Fanning; Christopher Walken; Giancarlo Giannini; Radha Mitchell; Marc Anthony; Rachel Ticotin; Mickey Rourke
- Cinematography: Paul Cameron
- Edited by: Christian Wagner
- Music by: Harry Gregson-Williams
- Production companies: Fox 2000 Pictures; New Regency Productions; Scott Free Productions
- Distributed by: 20th Century Fox
- Release dates: April 18, 2004 (Westwood, California premiere); April 23, 2004 (U.S.); October 4, 2004 (U.K.)
- Running time: 146 minutes
- Countries: United States; United Kingdom
- Languages: English; Spanish
- Budget: $60–70 million
- Box office: $130.3 million

Man on Fire is a 2004 action thriller film directed and co-produced by Tony Scott, from a screenplay by Brian Helgeland, based on the 1980 novel by A. J. Quinnell. Denzel Washington portrays John Creasy, a despondent, alcoholic former CIA SAD/SOG officer-turned-bodyguard, who goes on a revenge rampage after his charge, nine-year-old Lupita "Pita" Ramos (Dakota Fanning), is abducted in Mexico City. The supporting cast includes Christopher Walken, Radha Mitchell, Giancarlo Giannini, Marc Anthony, Rachel Ticotin and Mickey Rourke.

Quinnell's novel had previously been adapted into a feature film in 1987, which was also produced by Arnon Milchan. Helgeland's screenplay moves the story's setting from Naples, Italy to Mexico City.

The film was released in the United States by 20th Century Fox on April 21, 2004. The film received polarized reviews from critics, but grossed $130.3 million worldwide against a production budget of $60–70 million. In 2026, a remake mini-series premiered on Netflix.

== Plot ==
In 2003, former Force Recon Marine and CIA SAD/SOG officer John Creasy visits his old friend Paul Rayburn in Mexico. Rayburn convinces him to take a bodyguard position with Samuel Ramos, a Mexico City automaker whose young daughter Lupita (Pita) requires a bodyguard for her kidnapping insurance policy to take effect.

Struggling with alcoholism, burnout and guilt over his actions with the CIA, Creasy tries to commit suicide but his gun misfires. He is reminded by Rayburn of their saying "a bullet always tells the truth" and begins to consider that he was not meant to die. Seemingly revitalized, Creasy commits to his newfound purpose as Pita's protector, reducing his drinking and finding comfort in the pages of his Bible. He begins coaching Pita to become a more confident swimmer, bonding with her through the process.

One day while waiting outside Pita's piano lesson, Creasy recognizes a car that followed them earlier, as two federal policemen block the street. Realizing that Pita is about to be abducted, he kills four of the attackers including the officers but is critically wounded and Pita is taken. Creasy is declared a suspect, but Reforma reporter Mariana Garcia Guerrero questions why off-duty police officers were present in-uniform and in a police car. Federal police officer Miguel Manzano relocates a recovering him to a veterinary clinic to protect him from corrupt police.

"The Voice," the unseen leader of the kidnapping ring, demands a $10 million ransom and Samuel complies, with the help of police lieutenant Victor Fuentes. However, the kidnappers are ambushed at the ransom drop and the Voice’s nephew is killed. Holding the Ramos family responsible, the Voice informs them that Pita will be lost to them forever as retribution. Manzano warns Creasy that the kidnappers belong to a powerful "brotherhood" called La Hermandad that consists of corrupt officials, police and criminals. Creasy makes a promise to Pita's mother, Lisa, to kill everyone involved in the kidnapping.

With Rayburn’s help, Creasy obtains a small arsenal of weapons and equipment. He brutally interrogates and kills the getaway driver, who points him to a club where he confronts three of the kidnappers. Killing two criminal middlemen, Creasy recovers an incriminating ATM card and another kidnapped girl. He turns both over to Guerrero, who reveals that Fuentes is part of the brotherhood. Guerrero convinces Manzano to help Creasy wage war against the kidnappers. Waylaying Fuentes’s motorcade with a rocket-propelled grenade, Creasy abducts the officer, who admits that he had his officers ambush the ransom drop, but discovered afterward most of the ransom money had already been stolen by Jordan Kalfus, Samuel's lawyer. After killing Fuentes with a bomb in his rectum, Creasy searches Kalfus’s home and finds his decapitated corpse and a fax with bank account information leading to Samuel.

Creasy confronts Samuel and Lisa and Samuel confesses that Kalfus suggested they arrange the kidnapping to claim the insurance payout to settle his father's debts, though they were promised Pita would be returned unharmed. When Fuentes interfered with the drop, Samuel blamed Kalfus for Pita's death and murdered him. Lisa, now aware of Samuel's involvement, angrily tells Creasy to kill her husband or she will. He leaves Samuel a gun and the same bullet he attempted suicide with and a guilt-ridden Samuel commits suicide.

Guerrero and Manzano trace the ATM card to the Voice’s wife and find her address, allowing Manzano's officers to infiltrate her home and obtain a photo of the Voice. Despite the brotherhood’s threats, Guerrero publishes the photo and passes the address on to Creasy. Taking his brother Aurelio prisoner, Creasy is shot in the chest but Creasy arrives to confront Kalfus at his house but finds the lawyer's beheaded corpse floating in the pool. He then confronts Samuel about his involvement with the kidnapping and the ruse is revealed: Samuel and Kalfus agreed to orchestrate the kidnapping in order to pay off old debts belonging to the former's father. Both had expected Pita to be safely returned by paying off the ransom with the remaining insurance money. However, the ambush by Fuentes caused the plan to collapse, with Samuel killing Kalfus in a rage. Samuel kills himself as Creasy leaves.

Creasy captures the Voice's brother, who shoots him during the melee. learns the ringleader’s real name is Daniel Sanchez. He calls him and threatens his family, but Daniel reveals that Pita is alive, offering to trade her for his brother and for Creasy, which he accepts.

Instructing Lisa to join him at the exchange, Creasy reunites with Pita in the middle of an overpass, assuring her that he loves her before sending her to her mother. He and Aurelio are taken by Daniel’s men, but Creasy succumbs to his wounds. later that day, Manzano kills the Voice during the latter's arrest.

=== Unused alternate ending ===
In 2024, screenwriter Brian Helgeland revealed a controversial alternate ending that was axed by the studio.

In an alternate ending, Creasy does not succumb to his bullet wounds, but lives to confront The Voice (who is otherwise unseen in the film) in his office. After a verbal confrontation, Creasy kills himself and The Voice via suicide bombing using explosives planted in his rectum, a call-back to Fuentes' earlier death.

== Cast ==
- Denzel Washington as John W. Creasy, a former CIA operative and U.S. Marine Force Recon Captain, turned mercenary and bodyguard.
- Dakota Fanning as Lupita "Pita" Ramos, Creasy's charge.
- Marc Anthony as Samuel Ramos, a wealthy auto manufacturer and Pita's father.
- Radha Mitchell as Lisa Ramos, Pita's mother and a Texas native.
- Christopher Walken as Paul Rayburn, Creasy's former colleague, who runs a security firm in Mexico.
- Giancarlo Giannini as Miguel Manzano, a special agent of the Federal Investigative Agency (AFI). Tony Scott stated "Giancarlo loves women, as did this character."
- Mickey Rourke as Jordan Kalfus, Samuel Ramos' lawyer. Kalfus and Ramos' father were best friends, and therefore Kalfus has a close relationship with Samuel. Mickey Rourke stated that Kalfus has "a responsibility to his father, to him, to look out for his well-being." Therefore, Kalfus “[wants] to be there for him" when Ramos “gets his head underwater a little bit".
- Rachel Ticotin as Mariana Garcia Guerrero, a reporter for the Diario Reforma
- Roberto Sosa as Daniel Sanchez, the unseen mastermind of the kidnapping plot, known as "La Voz" ("The Voice").
- Jesús Ochoa as Victor Fuentes, a lieutenant in the Anti-Kidnapping Division of the Federal Judicial Police and the head of the criminal "La Hermandad" syndicate
- Gero Camilo as Aurelio Sánchez, the Voice's brother and accomplice.

Other actors in the film include Rosa María Hernández as Maria Rosas Sanchez, the Voice's wife; Charles Paraventi as Jersey Boy, The Voice's American accomplice; Mario Zaragoza as Jorge Gonzalez; a corrupt policeman and member of the "La Hermandad" syndicate, Carmen Salinas as one of the Voice's guardians, Angelina Peláez as Sister Anna, Alberto Estrella and Gerardo Taracena as AFI officers, Eduardo Yáñez as a bodyguard, and Itatí Cantoral as Evelyn.

== Background ==
Tony Scott, the film's director, had tried to adapt the 1980 source novel, by A. J. Quinnell, into a film in 1983. Journalist Paul Davies theorized that movie producers likely believed that Scott, whose only directorial work as of the time was 1983's The Hunger, lacked the experience to direct this as his second film. It was adapted by Élie Chouraqui in his English-language debut titled Man on Fire with Scott Glenn as Creasy. This movie, like the novel, was set in Italy, then a major center of kidnapping.

== Production ==
=== Development and writing ===
When a remake was first under consideration, producer Arnon Milchan (who also produced the 1987 version) looked at Michael Bay and Antoine Fuqua to direct, before asking Scott if he was still interested. 20th Century Fox wanted the film to still be set in Italy. An early draft of the script was set in Naples, with early reporting suggesting that the Mexico City filming was an odd stand in for Naples. Scott argued that if the setting would be Italy, then the film would have to be a period piece, since by the 2000s kidnappings had become a rare occurrence in Italy. Mexico City became the setting of the 2004 film because Mexico City had a high kidnapping rate, and for other reasons unspecified. As a result, the character Rika Balletto was renamed Lisa Martin Ramos, and Pinta Balletto was renamed Lupita "Pita" Ramos. Ettore Balletto became Samuel Ramos.

In adapting Quinnell's novel, screenwriter Brian Helgeland retained much of the author's original dialogue, a fact Quinnell noted favorably after the film's release. The identity of the kidnappers, brothers Daniel and Aurelio Sánchez, were allusions to the "Ear Lopper brothers"Daniel and Aurelio Arizmendi Lopez, notorious serial kidnappers and murderers. Kevin Freese of the Foreign Military Studies Office stated that "it appears that the allusion... escaped the comprehension of much of the audience."

Henry Bean was an uncredited script doctor.

=== Casting ===
Robert De Niro was originally offered the role of Creasy. Gene Hackman was also considered for Creasy, but Scott cast Washington in the role, after the two had worked together on Crimson Tide (1995). Marlon Brando was the original choice to play Rayburn, after being Scott's first choice to play Creasy in 1983.

Ricardo Darín was offered the role of The Voice, but turned it down.

Tony Scott cited City of God (2002) as an influence on the film's style, and hired actors Gero Camilo and Charles Paraventi as a nod to their roles in that movie.

=== Filming ===
Principal photography took place in Mexico, mainly in the cities of Mexico City, Ciudad Juárez, and Puebla. Interiors were shot at Estudios Churubusco. Marcelo Ebrard, the then-Chief of Police for Mexico City, served as a consultant to the producers, hoping the film would shed light on the kidnapping issue.

=== Soundtrack ===
The soundtrack was composed and conducted by Harry Gregson-Williams, featuring 20 tracks. It was released on July 27, 2004.

The cut "Smiling" from the soundtrack, was adopted as the theme for several television commercials for Omega watches from 2012 to 2013.

Additionally, the film prominently features music by Nine Inch Nails, with lead singer Trent Reznor credited as "Musical Consultant." The soundtrack includes six songs by Nine Inch Nails.

== Release and reception ==
=== Box office ===
Man on Fire opened in the U.S. on April 23, 2004, in 2,980 theaters and grossed $22,751,490 with an average of $7,634 and ranking No. 1 at the boxoffice. The film's widest release was 2,986 theaters and it ended up earning $77,911,774 in North America and $52,381,940 internationallyfor a total of $130,293,714 worldwide, against its $60–70 million production budget. The film was successful in the U.S. home video market, grossing more than $123 million in DVD and VHS rentals and sales in U.

=== Critical response ===
On Rotten Tomatoes, Man on Fire holds a rating of 39% based on 166 reviews with an average rating of 5.30/10. The consensus notes that "Man on Fire's solid action and top-shelf cast are undone by a relentlessly grim story that gets harder to take the longer it goes on." On Metacritic, the film has a score of 47 out of 100 based on 36 reviews, indicating "mixed or average reviews." However, audiences polled by CinemaScore gave the film a grade of "A−" on a scale from A to F.

Paul Davies, a journal article author, said that the critical reception to Man on Fire in the United States was "somewhat less than kind" because critics did not like the vigilantism that Creasy uses. Davies argues that "most critics missed" Creasy not taking "sadistic pleasure" in the killings since he kills to get information to get to all of the people involved in the kidnapping of Pita Ramos, and does not like harming innocent parties.

A. J. Quinnell had a favorable reception to this adaptation, mainly because the film used many of the book's lines. Quinnell said that usually screenwriters "like to leave their mark on the product." Quinnell added that even though he usually dislikes film adaptations of books, the writers "did a good job with Man On Fire and I loved the chemistry between Creasy and the girl" and "When I first heard Denzel was playing the part of Creasy I missed a couple of heartbeats but he played the part brilliantly. The film is violent and if the anger is not portrayed properly, the result can be awful."

=== Accolades ===
| Year | Award | Category | Candidate | Result | | | | | | | | | | | | | | | | | | | | | | | | | | | | | | | | | | | |
|---|---|---|---|---|---|---|---|---|---|---|---|---|---|---|---|---|---|---|---|---|---|---|---|---|---|---|---|---|---|---|---|---|---|---|---|---|---|---|---|
| 2004 | Golden Schmoes Awards | Best Supporting Actress of the Year | Dakota Fanning | - | 2005 | BMI Film & TV Awards | Premio IMC Film Music | Man on Fire | - | 2005 | Critics' Choice Movie Awards | Best Young Actress | Dakota Fanning | - | 2005 | Golden Trailer Awards | Best Action Movie | Man on Fire | - | 2005 | Golden Trailer Awards | Best Action Movie – Drama | Man on Fire | - | 2005 | NAACP Image Awards | Best Outstanding Feature Film | Man on Fire | - | 2005 | NAACP Image Awards | Best Actor | Denzel Washington | - | 2005 | Young Artist Awards | Best Young Actress | Dakota Fanning | - |

== Soundtrack ==
The cut "Smiling", from the soundtrack composed by Harry Gregson-Williams, has been adopted as the theme of a number of television commercials for Omega Watches in 2012 to 2013. The soundtrack containing 20 tracks, was composed by Harry Gregson-Williams, and was released on July 27, 2004.

The film heavily features the work of Nine Inch Nails (lead singer Trent Reznor is credited as "Musical Consultant") and includes six Nine Inch Nails songs.

== Remake ==
In 2005, a Hindi remake of the film by director Apoorva Lakhia, called Ek Ajnabee, was released. It starred Amitabh Bachchan as the lead (named Suryaveer "Surya" Singh). The same year, it was also remade in Tamil language as Aanai starring Arjun Sarja.

== See also ==
- Cinema of the United States
- List of American films of 2004
