= Neil Blair (agent) =

English literary agent and producer

- Born: 21 September 1966 (age 59); United Kingdom
- Occupations: Literary agent, television producer, film producer

Neil Blair (born 21 September 1966) is an English literary agent, television producer, and film producer.

== Early life ==
Neil Blair studied law at Exeter College, Oxford.

== Career ==
In 1990, after graduating from college, Blair joined the litigation team at the global law firm Linklaters. He later joined Warner Bros. Entertainment, where he became Head of Business Affairs, Europe, worked on productions such as Band of Brothers and Eyes Wide Shut, and helped acquire the film rights for J.K. Rowling’s Harry Potter series. In 2001 he left to join the Christopher Little Literary Agency. In 2011, Blair left Christopher Little Literary Agency to found The Blair Partnership. J.K. Rowling joined his client list after 15 years with the Christopher Little Literary Agency.

Blair is the Chairman of the Board and a Director of Pottermore and Chairman of the production companies Brontë Film and Television, founded to develop and produce projects commissioned from J.K. Rowling’s novels, and Snowed-In Productions, founded to work on non J.K. Rowling projects.

== Charitable work ==
Blair is Chairman of J.K. Rowling’s children’s charity Lumos. He is a UK ambassador for The Abraham Initiatives and a board member of JW3. In 2017, he and his wife, Debra, supported the construction of archive space and a reading room on Exeter College’s Cohen Quadrangle to help preserve 30,000 rare books, including important Judaica such as the Soncino Bible, the earliest full text bible ever printed.

== Personal life ==
Blair has said that books and being Jewish "are very close to my heart". He is a fan of West Ham and Saracens.

== Filmography ==
Year	Title	Credited as	Ref.
Year	Title	Executive producer	Ref.
2015	The Casual Vacancy	Yes	
2016	Fantastic Beasts and Where to Find Them	Yes	
2017–present	Strike	Yes	
2018	Fantastic Beasts: The Crimes of Grindelwald	Yes	
2018	Mrs. Wilson	Yes	
2027	Harry Potter	Yes	
