= Man on Fire (2018 film) =

- Directed by: Joel Fendelman
- Produced by: Joel Fendelman; Sullivan Rauzi; James Chase Sanchez
- Starring: Ron Blanton
- Cinematography: Joel Fendelman; Caleb B. Kuntz
- Edited by: Joel Fendelman
- Music by: Gil Talmi
- Release dates: January 20, 2018 (Slamdance Film Festival); December 17, 2018
- Running time: 54 minutes
- Country: United States
- Language: English

Man on Fire is a 2018 documentary film by Joel Fendelman about the 2014 self-immolation of anti-racist social justice pastor Charles Moore in his hometown of Grand Saline, Texas.

It won the David L. Wolper Award of the International Documentary Association, the Best Student Award at the San Luis Obispo Film Festival, and the Feature Film Programmers Choice Award at the Sidewalk Film Festival. It was nominated for Best Documentary Feature at the Slamdance Film Festival.

== Cast ==
- Ron Blanton
