= Man on Fire (1987 film) =

1987 film by Élie Chouraqui

- Theatrical release poster
- Directed by: Élie Chouraqui
- Screenplay by: Elie Chouraqui; Sergio Donati; Fabrice Ziolkowski
- Based on: Man on Fire by A. J. Quinnell
- Produced by: Arnon Milchan
- Starring: Scott Glenn; Brooke Adams; Danny Aiello; Joe Pesci; Paul Shenar; Jonathan Pryce; Jade Malle
- Narrated by: Scott Glenn
- Cinematography: Gerry Fisher
- Edited by: Noëlle Boisson
- Music by: John Scott
- Production companies: 7 Films Cinéma; Cima Produzioni; FR3 Films Production
- Distributed by: Acteurs Auteurs Associés (France); Tri-Star Pictures (United States)
- Release dates: 4 September 1987 (France); 24 May 1988 (Italy)
- Running time: 92 minutes
- Countries: France; Italy
- Languages: English; French; Italian
- Box office: $519,596 (USA)

Man on Fire (French: L'homme de feu) is a 1987 action thriller film directed and co-written by Élie Chouraqui, produced by Arnon Milchan, based on the 1980 novel by A. J. Quinnell. It stars Scott Glenn, Jade Malle, Joe Pesci, Brooke Adams, Danny Aiello, Paul Shenar, and Jonathan Pryce. Glenn plays Christian Creasy, an ex-CIA agent hired as a bodyguard to the daughter of a wealthy Italian family, who is targeted for kidnapping.

A French and Italian co-production, the film premiered on September 4, 1987, to a mixed critical reception. Another film adaptation was released in 2004, also produced by Milchan.

== Plot summary ==
In Italy, wealthy families often hire bodyguards to protect family members from the threat of kidnapping. A wealthy family that needs a bodyguard hires Christian Creasy, a burned-out ex-CIA agent turned mercenary, to protect their daughter, Samantha "Sam" Balletto. Creasy has been broken down from all of the death and horror of combat he witnessed in Vietnam, South America, and Lebanon. Although Creasy is not interested in being a bodyguard, especially to a twelve-year-old girl, he accepts the assignment because he has no better job offers.

The precocious child's persistent questions about Creasy and his life are all Creasy can bear. But as she gradually breaks down his tough exterior, his barriers come down, and he starts to open up to her. They become friends and he replaces her parents in their absences, giving her advice, guidance, and help with track. Creasy's life is shattered when Sam is kidnapped by the mafia. Despite being seriously wounded during the kidnapping, Creasy halts his recovery to get weapons from his former partner, David. Creasy vows Sam's safe return, as well as vengeance on the kidnappers.

== Cast ==
- Scott Glenn as Christian Creasy, a former Navy SEAL and CIA officer from Northern California who becomes a bodyguard
- Jade Malle as Samantha "Sam" Balletto, a young girl and Creasy's ward.
- Joe Pesci as David, Creasy's friend, former partner and confidante who lives in Italy.
- Jonathan Pryce as Michael
- Brooke Adams as Jane Balletto
- Danny Aiello as Conti, an Italian-American mafia don.
- Paul Shenar as Ettore Balletto
- Giancarlo Prete as Detective Satta
- Lorenzo Piani as Bruno Lezzi
- Inigo Lezzi as Bellu
- Franco Trevisi as Rabbia
- Alessandro Haber as Sandri
- Laura Morante as Julia
- Lou Castel as Violente
- Giuseppe Cederna as Snake
- Giovanni Mauriello as Elio
- Angela Finocchiaro as Marisa
- Anita Zagaria as Conti's Wife

== Production ==
Tony Scott was originally slated to direct, but the studio balked because at the time they felt he was not accomplished enough to pull off the project. He would go on to direct the 2004 film adaptation, with Denzel Washington as Creasy.

Producer Arnon Milchan wanted Sergio Leone to direct Robert De Niro, while Scott wanted either Marlon Brando or Robert Duvall as his leading man when he was slated to direct. The screenplay underwent several revisions.

The music score for Man on Fire was provided by English film composer and music conductor John Scott. A cue from the film's score – titled "We've Got Each Other" in the soundtrack album – was later incorporated into the score for the 1988 film Die Hard. (The cue can be heard near the end of the film when John McClane and Holly Gennaro exit the Nakatomi Building and McClane sees Sgt. Al Powell face to face for the first time.)

== Distribution ==
The film was screened at the 13th Deauville American Film Festival in Deauville, France. It was one of 40 films screened during the festival. The 13th Deauville film festival ran from 4 to 14 September 1987.

The film was released in 1987 on VHS. It had originally been released on DVD overseas, but not in the United States, save for bootlegs. However, on 15 November 2016, Kino Lorber released the first official Blu-ray Disc and DVD.

== Reception ==
Leonard Klady of the Los Angeles Times said that the film's script "limps along as badly as its protagonist" and that the film "is simply cold-comfort movie-going." Michael Spies of the Houston Chronicle said that the film "not only lacks emotion, it lacks wit and cool. It just has lots of atmosphere." Caryn James of The New York Times said that the film "always seems about to slip into unconsciousness." Lloyd Sachs of the Chicago Sun-Times said, "Unfortunately, when it's required to make sense, Man on Fire doesn't. Which is too bad, because Glenn's strong physical and emotional presence deserves better. All things considered, it's one of the best things he's done." Eleanor Ringel of The Atlanta Journal-Constitution said that the film "burns itself out well before it's done" even though Scott Glenn "manages to strike a few sparks along the way." John H. Richardson of the Los Angeles Daily News called Man on Fire "a pretentious revenge picture." He argued that since the film is "basically just another Death Wish, [...] directed with the crawling elegiac pace and visual luxury of a big-budget European art film," it demonstrates "the worst of both worlds." Desmond Ryan of The Philadelphia Inquirer, who gave the film two stars, said Man on Fire is an extremely empty film" and "For all the movie's handsome gloss, I doubt if we are missing much."

Bill Kaufman of Newsday said that the film was "suspenseful, with some exciting moments despite the choppy direction." Kaufman argued that the film "plods along for its first half-hour or so, dwelling too long" on the relationship between Creasy and Sam, but "things pick up, and the movie's tempo changes dramatically" when Sam's kidnapping occurs, and "only then does the picture come into its own as a suspense film with some taut moments." Kaufman said that people who like action films would find Man on Fire entertaining.

According to the Times of Malta obituary of A. J. Quinnell, he and the cinema-going public were not satisfied with the film. Quinnell said that the film "was so bad it became a cult movie in a European country. The director had never read the book and when I travelled to Paris to see the finished product I couldn't recognise anything I wrote." Quinnell was much happier with the 2004 version of film, which was a major box office success. Sachs said that he consulted a young expert of A. J. Quinnell books about the film, and that the individual said, "About all they kept was the title. What garbage!" except that the individual did not use the word "garbage."

Ringel said that the film "is actually two movies rather clumsily stitched together"; she believed the first part was "a likable character study" that was the superior portion of the film while the remainder was "a routine vigilante flick" that had the "most distracting production design". Ringel added that Man on Fire is part artsy European, part shoot-'em-up American, and the parts are so self-consciously constructed that they refuse to have anything to do with one another." The Lexington Herald-Leader said that the film "veers erratically between existential meditation and conventional vengeance drama."

=== Visuals ===
Eleanor Ringel of The Atlanta Journal-Constitution says that Creasy "introduces himself to us in a Sunset Boulevard–style opening."

Desmond Ryan of The Philadelphia Inquirer said that the director "has invested a great deal of care in making Man on Fire visually interesting". John H. Richardson of the Los Angeles Daily News said "One thing you have to say for Man on Fire: If they gave an Oscar for best location scouting, this film should win it. From a palazzo on Lake Como to a huge sun-lit industrial loft to a cavernous underground boat dock, this film has some of the best-looking backgrounds of the year." Caryn James of The New York Times said that the film "is so full of rain it looks like monsoon season on Lake Como, but that makes as much sense as anything else the director and co-writer Elie Chouraqui has imagined." Ryan said that "[t]he settings and camera-work owe much to Ridley Scott and his disciples, but Chouraqui has forgotten that what you hear matters as much as what you see." Ryan added that "[t]he connections from scene to scene are always arbitrary and occasionally incomprehensible, giving Man on Fire the feel of a movie that was drastically edited".

=== Casting ===
Eleanor Ringel of The Atlanta Journal-Constitution said that the director "obviously has an excellent eye for actors but no idea how to use them once he's cast them." Ringel said that the characters Jane Balletto and Michael, played respectively by Brooke Adams and Jonathan Pryce, each are in two scenes and have about four lines of dialog. Michael Spies of the Houston Chronicle said, "As often happens in these international productions, actors make hello-goodbye appearances, including Brooke Adams, who has perhaps one line as the girl's mother, and Jonathan Pryce, who has maybe a couple more as a representative of the family business." James said, "Blink a few times and you'll miss Brooke Adams as Sam's mother, and Danny Aiello as the American ringleader of the Italian terrorists." Sachs said that Adams and Pryce, who were two of the production's top-billed actors, "have approximately five lines between them", and that is "[a] sure giveaway" that the production "has not enjoyed a trouble-free transition." Ryan speculated that the movie may have been severely edited and "what Pryce and his likewise-underutilized co-stars contributed ended up on the cutting-room floor."

Sachs said that Aiello, as Conti, "sounds Italian when he's demanding dough and American when he's begging for his life." In the entire film, Conti has one scene where he speaks. Kaufman said that Aiello, as Conti, "is suitably sinister".

Samantha compares Creasy and herself to the main characters of Of Mice and Men, George Milton and Lenny Small. In regards to Samantha, James stated that "this literary child breaks through Creasy's tough-guy defenses." Sachs said that Samantha is "a survivor in her own right - of a troubled marriage, having no friends, etc." but that she is "too smart and adorable to resist." Richardson said "[t]hey talk about the works of John Steinbeck and the fine points of jogging, and before you can say 'Lolita', the pair are involved in a kind of romance." Kaufman said that Malle portrays Sam "with appealing, moppet-like charm".

Ryan said "How - or why - anyone would recruit an actor of the caliber of [Pryce] and then give him just a few lines on the telephone is anyone's guess."

Richardson said that Adams's role is a "cameo."

==== Creasy ====
Bill Kaufman of Newsday said that the "sullen and taciturn" Creasy appears "a bit shaggy" and "doesn't seem much like a tough guy." John H. Richardson of the Los Angeles Daily News said that in the beginning of the film, Creasy is "a morbid guy" who has an appearance "like a thinner Chuck Norris, but he has these huge bags under his eyes and a twitch in his cheek, and he tends to stare off into the distance with the cosmic gloom of someone who has Seen the Darkness in the Human Soul." Kaufman added that the actor, as Creasy, "is a bit reminiscent of Chuck Norris." Eleanor Ringel of The Atlanta Journal-Constitution said that the actor as Creasy, "with his scruffy beard and melancholy eyes", "calls to mind Max von Sydow as Christ in The Greatest Story Ever Told.

Caryn James of The New York Times said that compared to other films he starred in, Scott "has less presence than usual here." Ringel concluded that "[e]xcellent actor that he is, he lends power and authority to this disjointed work, but even he can't pull together a script that's heading off in opposite directions. After a while, you figure he took the part because the idea of a paid vacation in Italy was too appealing to pass up." Desmond Ryan of The Philadelphia Inquirer said that while "Glenn is quite capable of livening up humbler movie genres [...] the muddle of pretension and largely incoherent action here is beyond his redemptive powers" and "[a]t least Glenn has been asked to do something, which is more than can be claimed by anyone else in the cast." Kaufman said that Glenn "turns in a creditable performance as the driven man."

When asked in 2015 about playing the part of Creasy, Scott Glenn responded,

I loved doing that part, and I thought that the film itself wound up being really good. I felt good about it. I felt good about my performance, I felt good about everything. And just in terms of comfort and luxury and fun, it was probably the best location I’d ever been on in my life. You know, six weeks at the Villa D’Este on Lake Como, and then a couple of months in Rome. It had a great producer — Arnon Milchan—and Élie Chouraqui, the director — I felt like his take on that character and that story was right on.

== Other adaptations ==
Another film adaptation of Quinnell's novel, also called Man on Fire, was produced in the United States and released in 2004. The film was also produced by Arnon Milchan and directed by Tony Scott (who had originally been slated to direct the 1987 film), with Denzel Washington as Creasy and Dakota Fanning as his charge (renamed 'Pita Ramos'). The adaptation notably shifts the story's location from Naples to Mexico City. Compared to his critical response to the 1987 film, A.J. Quinnell praised the 2004 film.

Two other adaptations of Man on Fire have been produced in India, both released in 2005:

- Ek Ajnabee - A Hindi-language remake directed by Apoorva Lakhia and starred Amitabh Bachchan in the lead role, renamed Suryaveer "Surya" Singh.
- Aanai - A Tamil-language remake, directed by Selvaa and featuring Arjun Sarja in the lead role.

In March 2023, Netflix ordered a television series adaptation of the novel with Kyle Killen as writer and executive producer. Yahya Abdul-Mateen II was cast as Creasy.
