= A. J. Quinnell =

English thriller novelist (1940–2005)

- Born: Philip Nicholson; 25 June 1940; Nuneaton, Warwickshire, England, U.K.
- Died: 10 July 2005 (aged 65); Gozo, Malta
- Occupation: Novelist
- Writing career
- Genre: Thriller fiction
- Notable works: Man on Fire, The Mahdi

Philip Nicholson (25 June 1940 – 10 July 2005), known by his pen name A. J. Quinnell, was an English novelist. He is best known for his novel Man on Fire, which has been adapted to film twice and a television series. Later in life he spent much of his time in Gozo, Malta, where he died.

== Life and work ==
Nicholson travelled throughout his life and several minor characters in his books are based on real people that he encountered on his travels. Nicholson was married three times. His last wife, Elsebeth Egholm, is a Danish mystery novelist. The couple maintained residences on the island of Gozo and in Denmark.

When the author was preparing to publish his first book, Man on Fire, he wanted to keep his real identity a secret. During a conversation in a bar, his agent, Chris Little, told him he could use a pseudonym. The author chose "Quinnell", after the rugby union player Derek Quinnell and "A. J." from the initials of the bartender's son. Nicholson frequented Gleneagles bar in Mġarr, Gozo, the town where the Malta ferry disembarks. He could often be found drinking vodka sodas. He wrote late at night and through until the morning, always standing up. He also sponsored a local Gozo association football (soccer) team and was admired by the Gozitans.

The author's best-known creation was the character of Marcus Creasy, an American-born former member of the French Foreign Legion. The Creasy novels are cult favorites in Japan.

Man on Fire was directly adapted for film twice, in 1987 and 2004. The latter film was adapted into a 2005 Bollywood film. This resulted in a wider demand for Quinnell's books, especially those that feature Creasy (listed in the Bibliography below).

At the time of his death, he was writing a prequel to the Creasy series. In 2005 The Independent wrote that "Many of his novels are now out of print and much sought after."

== Bibliography ==
- Man on Fire (1980) – Creasy 1
- The Mahdi (1981)
- Snap Shot (aka The Snap) (1982)
- Blood Ties (1985)
- Siege of Silence (1986)
- In the Name of the Father (1987)
- The Perfect Kill (1992) – Creasy 2
- The Shadow (1992)
- The Blue Ring (1993) – Creasy 3
- Black Horn (1994) – Creasy 4
- Message from Hell (1996) – Creasy 5
- The Trail of Tears (1999)
- A Quiet Night in Hell (2001)
- The Scalpel (2001)
