= Arnon Milchan =

Israeli billionaire businessman, film producer and former spy (born 1944)

- ארנון מילצ'ן
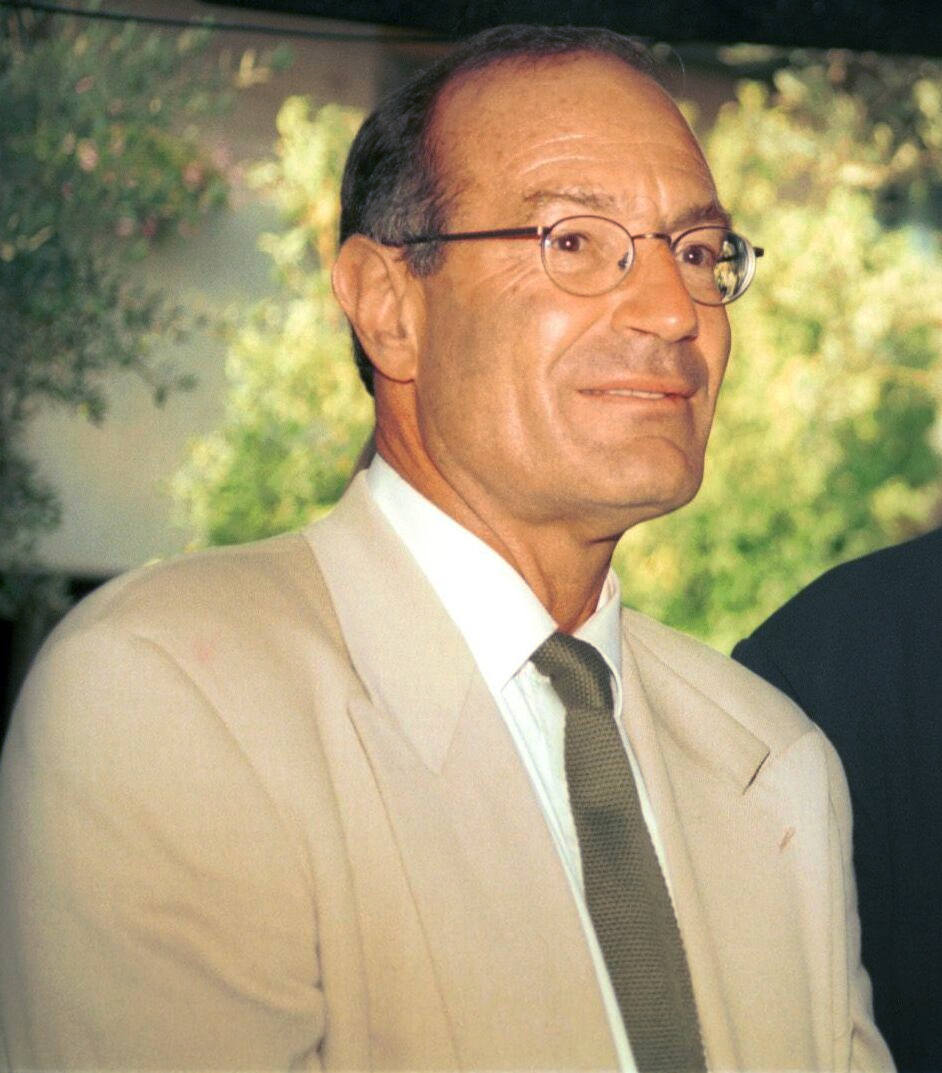
- Born: December 6, 1944 (age 81); Rehovot, Mandatory Palestine (now Israel)
- Occupations: Businessman, Film producer
- Known for: Founder of Regency Enterprises
- Spouse(s): Brigitte Genmaire (divorced); Amanda Coetzer
- Children: 5

Arnon Milchan (Hebrew: ארנון מילצ'ן; December 6, 1944) is an Israeli billionaire businessman, film producer and former spy. He has been involved in over 130 full-length motion pictures and is the founder of production company Regency Enterprises. Regency's film credits include 12 Years a Slave, JFK, Heat, Fight Club, and Mr. & Mrs. Smith. Milchan has earned two nominations for the Academy Award for Best Picture, for L.A. Confidential and The Revenant; he also produced Best Picture nominees The Big Short, 12 Years a Slave, and Birdman, with the latter two winning the award in consecutive years.

Milchan was also an Israeli intelligence operative from the mid-1960s to the mid-1980s.

As of January 2026, Forbes estimated Milchan's net worth at US$6.4 billion, ranked 605th worldwide.

== Early life ==
Milchan was born in Rehovot, Mandatory Palestine, to a Jewish family. He has a sister named Dalia. His mother was descended from European Jewish disciples of the rabbi Vilna Gaon who came to Palestine in the early 19th century, and he is the eighth generation of his family in the country.

== Business career ==
His father owned a fertilizer company, which Milchan inherited at the age of 21 upon his father's sudden death. Over the years, Milchan turned the company into a successful chemical business. He also earned a degree from the London School of Economics, before he and his company (Milchan Brothers Ltd.) were recruited to Lekem, a secret Israeli intelligence organization responsible for obtaining technology and material for Israel's nuclear program, and other highly secretive programs.

== Film production career ==
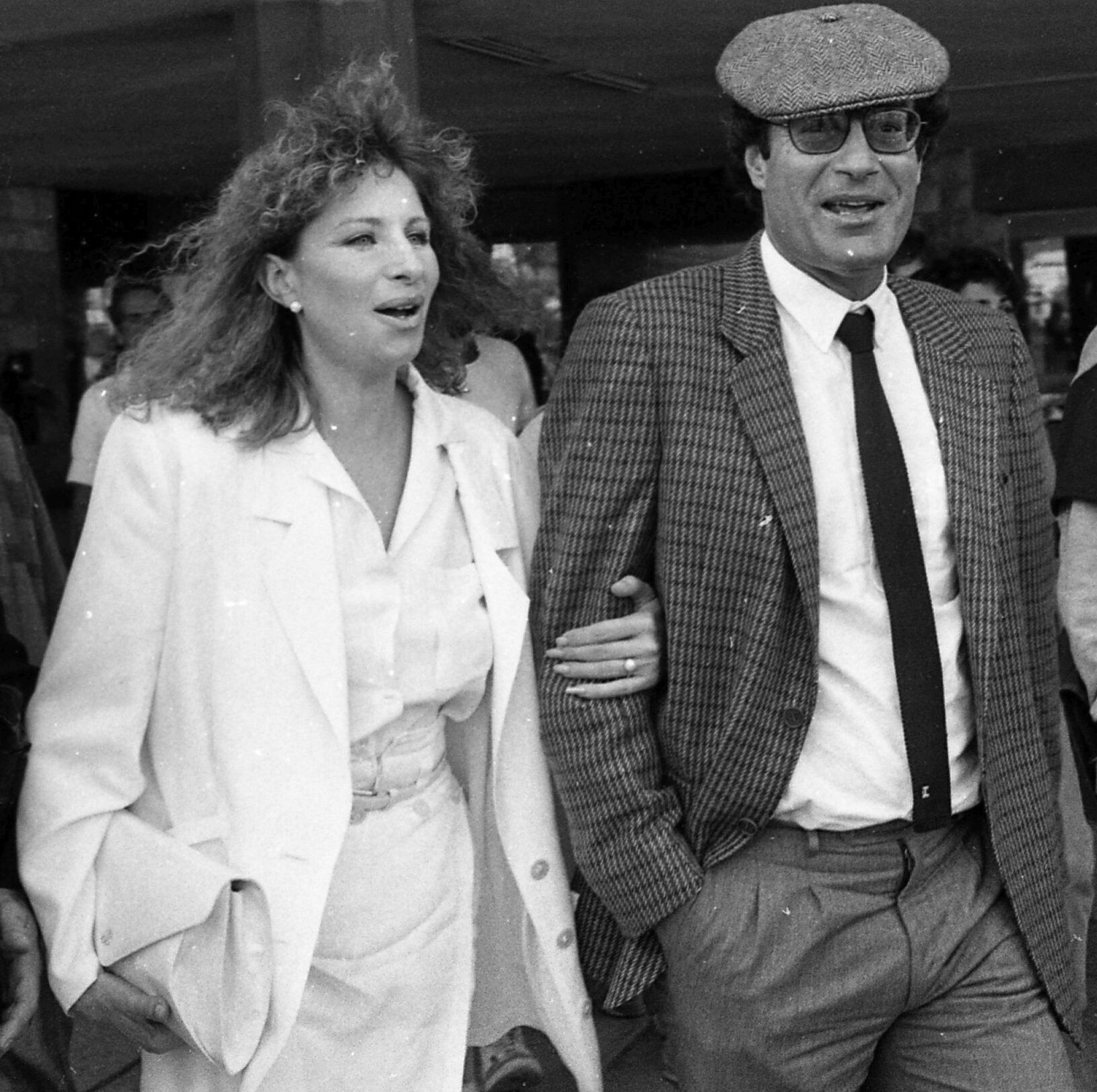
Milchan with Barbra Streisand, 1984. Photographer: Yosi Aloni, Dan Hadani collection, National Library of Israel

Milchan became involved in the movie business in 1977, after an introduction to American producer Elliot Kastner. In 1981 he partnered with Sydney Pollack on the US miniseries Masada. Most notable among Milchan's film collaborations was his early work with Martin Scorsese. He developed close friendships with Robert De Niro, and directors Roman Polanski, Sergio Leone, Terry Gilliam and Oliver Stone. Milchan started his own production company in 1991 called New Regency Productions. Through his company Regency, in partnership with Warner Bros., and later with Rupert Murdoch at 20th Century Fox, and other business ventures, such as Puma AG, Milchan acquired a net worth estimated at $5.1 billion as of 2015.

Milchan has produced over 130 films, such as Noah (2014), 12 Years a Slave (2013), Once Upon a Time in America (1984) (in which he also makes a cameo appearance as the chauffeur), Brazil (1985), Pretty Woman (1990), JFK (1991), Under Siege (1992), Natural Born Killers (1994), Boys on the Side (1995), Heat (1995), L.A. Confidential (1997), Fight Club (1999), Unfaithful (2002), Mr. and Mrs. Smith (2005), and Knight and Day (2010), among others, to his credit. He was a producer on two more recent Oscar-winners for Best Picture, 12 Years a Slave in 2014 and Birdman in 2015, but he was not listed as a producer in the nominees list.

Milchan is also the owner of the WTA broadcasting rights. He was married to model Brigitte Genmaire. He is now married to former South African tennis professional Amanda Coetzer. He is owner of the network which transmits Israeli television programming to the United States and Canada. He is also a part owner of Israel's TV Channel 10, and a former owner of Puma, the international sportswear line.

== Intelligence career ==
Speculation about Milchan's involvement in arms dealing and intelligence activities was sparked after the indictment in 1985 of Dr. Richard Kelly Smyth, an aerospace executive and scientist who had made illegal shipments of Krytrons, which could be used as nuclear weapon triggers, through one of Milchan's companies. This remained largely in the category of rumor until biographers Meir Doron and Joseph Gelman wrote a controversial unauthorized biography of Milchan that was published in July 2011. The biography Confidential, which is largely sympathetic to Milchan, revealed in detail how he involved himself in espionage, big-ticket arms-dealing, and obtaining sensitive technology and materials for Israel's nuclear weapons program. The research in Confidential – The Life Of Secret Agent Turned Hollywood Tycoon established that "at least through the mid-1980s [Milchan] was a full-fledged operative for Israel's top-secret intelligence agency, Lekem. His activities included "buying components to build and maintain Israel's nuclear arsenal" and supervising "government-backed accounts and front companies that financed the special needs of the entirety of Israel's intelligence operations outside the country". Interviewed regarding Milchan's intelligence activities, Israeli President Shimon Peres stated:

"Arnon is a special man. It was I who recruited him.... When I was at the Ministry of Defense, Arnon was involved in numerous defense-related procurement activities and intelligence operations. His strength is in making connections at the highest levels.... His activities gave us a huge advantage, strategically, diplomatically and technologically." (interview dated February 8, 2010, documented in Meir Doron and Joseph Gelman's "Confidential: Secret Agent turned Hollywood Tycoon Arnon Milchan" p. xi).

Two years later, on November 25, 2013, on the Channel 2 documentary program Uvda, Milchan confirmed on camera the central claims in the book Confidential that had been released earlier. The announcement caused international interest in the story and was covered widely.

Peres, the architect of Israel's secret nuclear weapons program in the 1960s, stated that in the 1960s he recruited Milchan to work for the Israeli Bureau of Scientific Relations (LEKEM or LAKAM), a secret intelligence organization tasked with obtaining military technology and science espionage. Milchan acknowledged that he was a secret arms dealer for the Israeli government and claimed to have used his connections to promote the apartheid regime in South Africa in exchange for it helping Israel to acquire uranium for its nuclear program.

In June 2023, Milchan provided some details about the friendship he developed with future Israeli Prime Minister Benjamin Netanyahu during his time as an intelligence officer, with the two having gone from being simple acquaintances to knowing each other "like brothers."

== Controversy ==
In February 2018, Israeli Police recommended that Arnon Milchan, alongside Israeli Prime Minister, Benjamin Netanyahu, be charged with bribery. The recommendation in the case, nicknamed "Case 1000", relates to alleged bribes Milchan provided to Netanyahu in exchange for special tax exemption legislation believed to benefit Milchan in his homeland of Israel. The proposed legislation, nicknamed "Milchan's Law", dates back to 2013 and was an alleged ploy to extend Milchan's status as a returning resident to allow him to take advantage of tax breaks. According to the police, the gifts from Milchan were worth more than 1 million shekels. Milchan had held fundraisers for Netanyahu, which included a 2014 event at a residence on Carbon Beach in Malibu that controversially inconvenienced residents and commuters with hours of unexpected lane blockages on Pacific Coast Highway, despite being a private event. Portions of Milchan's interrogation by the Israeli police were covered in the 2024 political documentary The Bibi Files.

On June 25, 2023, Milchan began his first day of testimony as a prosecution witness in Case 1000 and acknowledged that he gave the Netanyahu family numerous gifts and used code names for the gifts which were exchanged as well. However, Milchan also claimed he never thought the gifts would qualify as legal issues, as they were requests which were related to his friendship with the Netanyahus and not demands. Due to his health, Milchan did not appear in-person at the Jerusalem courthouse and gave video testimony from a courthouse in Brighton, United Kingdom.

== Personal life ==
Milchan was first married to French model Brigitte Genmaire and later divorced. The couple had three children, Elinor, Alexandra, and Yariv. Elinor Milchan is a professional photographer and Alexandra is a film producer. He later married South African retired professional tennis player Amanda Coetzer and had two children with her (Shimon and Olivia).

Allegedly, Israeli Prime Minister Benjamin Netanyahu asked U.S. Secretary of State John Kerry three times in 2014 to arrange a long-term visa for Milchan to live in the United States. Milchan does not live in Israel and has not been there since 2016.

=== Art collecting ===
Milchan is an art collector, and in April 2015, CNBC ranked him at No. 3 in their list of "Hollywood's top 10 art collectors" with a collection valued at $600 million, equal with George Lucas, ranked No. 2, but some way behind David Geffen at No. 1, with a collection valued at $2.3 billion.

== Production companies ==
- Embassy International Pictures N.V. (1982–1989)
- Regency International Pictures (1989–1991)
- Alcor Films (1991–1995)
- Regency Enterprises (1991–)
- New Regency Productions (1991–)

== Filmography ==
=== 20th Century Fox ===
==== Producer ====
Year	Title	Director	Notes
1982	The King of Comedy	Martin Scorsese	
1985	Brazil	Terry Gilliam	With Universal Pictures
1985	Legend	Ridley Scott	With Universal Pictures
1989	The War of the Roses	Danny DeVito	
1998	Dangerous Beauty	Marshall Herskovitz	With Warner Bros.
2000	Tigerland	Joel Schumacher	
2001	Don't Say a Word	Gary Fleder	
2001	Black Knight	Gil Junger	
2002	High Crimes	Carl Franklin	
2002	Life or Something Like It	Stephen Herek	
2003	Daredevil	Mark Steven Johnson	
2003	Runaway Jury	Gary Fleder	
2004	Man on Fire	Tony Scott	
2005	Elektra	Rob Bowman	
2005	Mr. & Mrs. Smith	Doug Liman	
2005	Stay	Marc Forster	
2005	Little Manhattan	Mark Levin	
2006	The Sentinel	Clark Johnson	
2006	Just My Luck	Donald Petrie	
2006	My Super Ex-Girlfriend	Ivan Reitman	
2006	Deck the Halls	John Whitesell	
2008	Jumper	Doug Liman	
2011	Monte Carlo	Thomas Bezucha	
2013	Broken City	Allen Hughes	
2013	Runner Runner	Brad Furman	
2014	Gone Girl	David Fincher	
2015	Unfinished Business	Ken Scott	
2015	The Revenant	Alejandro González Iñárritu	
2016	Rules Don't Apply	Warren Beatty	
2016	A Cure for Wellness	Gore Verbinski	
2016	Assassin's Creed	Justin Kurzel	
2018	Widows	Steve McQueen	
2019	Ad Astra	James Gray	

==== Executive producer ====
Year	Title	Director	Notes
1999	Simply Irresistible	Mark Tarlov	
1999	Entrapment	Jon Amiel	
1999	Fight Club	David Fincher	
2000	Big Momma's House	Raja Gosnell	
2001	Freddy Got Fingered	Tom Green	
2001	Joy Ride	John Dahl	
2001	Joe Somebody	John Pasquin	
2002	Unfaithful	Adrian Lyne	
2003	Down with Love	Peyton Reed	
2004	The Girl Next Door	Luke Greenfield	
2004	First Daughter	Forest Whitaker	
2006	Big Momma's House 2	John Whitesell	
2006	Date Movie	Jason Friedberg; Aaron Seltzer	
2007	Epic Movie	Jason Friedberg; Aaron Seltzer	
2007	Alvin and the Chipmunks	Tim Hill	
2008	Meet the Spartans	Jason Friedberg; Aaron Seltzer	
2008	Shutter	Masayuki Ochiai	
2008	What Happens in Vegas	Tom Vaughan	
2008	Meet Dave	Brian Robbins	
2008	Mirrors	Alexandre Aja	
2008	Marley & Me	David Frankel	
2009	Bride Wars	Gary Winick	
2009	Aliens in the Attic	John Schultz	
2009	Fantastic Mr. Fox	Wes Anderson	
2009	Alvin and the Chipmunks: The Squeakquel	Betty Thomas	
2010	Marmaduke	Tom Dey	
2010	Knight and Day	James Mangold	
2010	Vampires Suck	Jason Friedberg; Aaron Seltzer	
2010	Mirrors 2	Víctor Garcia	Direct-to-video
2010	Love & Other Drugs	Edward Zwick	
2011	Big Mommas: Like Father, Like Son	John Whitesell	
2011	Marley & Me: The Puppy Years	Michael Damian	Direct-to-video
2011	What's Your Number?	Mark Mylod	
2011	In Time	Andrew Niccol	
2011	Alvin and the Chipmunks: Chipwrecked	Mike Mitchell	
2011	The Darkest Hour	Chris Gorak	With Summit Entertainment
2013	The Internship	Shawn Levy	
2014	Joy Ride 3: Roadkill	Declan O'Brien	Direct-to-video
2015	Alvin and the Chipmunks: The Road Chip	Walt Becker	
2018	Unsane	Steven Soderbergh	With Bleecker Street and Fingerprint Releasing
2018	Bohemian Rhapsody	Bryan Singer	

=== Fox Searchlight Pictures ===
Executive producer

Year	Title	Director
1999	A Midsummer Night's Dream	Michael Hoffman
2005	Bee Season	Scott McGehee; David Siegel
2008	Street Kings	David Ayer
2015	True Story	Rupert Goold

Producer

Year	Title	Director
2013	12 Years a Slave	Steve McQueen
2014	Birdman	Alejandro González Iñárritu

=== 20th Century Studios ===
Year	Title	Director
2022	Barbarian	Zach Cregger
2022	Amsterdam	David O. Russell
2023	The Creator	Gareth Edwards
2026	Psycho Killer	Gavin Polone

=== Warner Bros. ===
==== Producer ====
Year	Title	Director	Notes
1984	Once Upon a Time in America	Sergio Leone	Actor - as chauffeur
1991	Guilty by Suspicion	Irwin Winkler	
1992	The Mambo Kings	Arne Glimcher	
1992	The Power of One	John G. Avildsen	
1992	Under Siege	Andrew Davis	
1992	That Night	Craig Bolotin	
1993	Sommersby	Jon Amiel	
1993	Made in America	Richard Benjamin	
1993	Six Degrees of Separation	Fred Schepisi	With Metro-Goldwyn-Mayer
1993	Heaven & Earth	Oliver Stone	
1994	The Client	Joel Schumacher	
1995	Boys on the Side	Herbert Ross	
1995	Under Siege 2: Dark Territory	Geoff Murphy	
1995	Empire Records	Allan Moyle	
1995	Copycat	Jon Amiel	
1996	The Sunchaser	Michael Cimino	
1996	A Time to Kill	Joel Schumacher	
1996	Carpool	Arthur Hiller	
1996	Bogus	Norman Jewison	
1997	Murder at 1600	Dwight H. Little	
1997	L.A. Confidential	Curtis Hanson	
1997	The Devil's Advocate	Taylor Hackford	
1997	The Man Who Knew Too Little	Jon Amiel	
1998	Dangerous Beauty	Marshall Herskovitz	With 20th Century Fox
1998	The Negotiator	F. Gary Gray	
2006	The Fountain	Darren Aronofsky	

==== Executive producer ====
Year	Title	Director
1991	Switch	Blake Edwards
1991	JFK	Oliver Stone
1992	Memoirs of an Invisible Man	John Carpenter
1993	Falling Down	Joel Schumacher
1993	Free Willy	Simon Wincer
1993	The Nutcracker	Emile Ardolino
1994	Natural Born Killers	Oliver Stone
1994	Second Best	Chris Menges
1994	The New Age	Michael Tolkin
1994	Cobb	Ron Shelton
1995	Free Willy 2: The Adventure Home	Dwight H. Little
1995	Heat	Michael Mann
1996	Tin Cup	Ron Shelton
1997	Free Willy 3: The Rescue	Sam Pillsbury
1997	Breaking Up	Robert Greenwald
1998	City of Angels	Brad Silberling
1998	Goodbye Lover	Roland Joffé

=== TriStar Pictures ===
Year	Title	Director	Notes
1987	Man on Fire	Élie Chouraqui	
1989	Who's Harry Crumb?	Paul Flaherty	
1990	Q&A	Sidney Lumet	
1996	The Mirror Has Two Faces	Barbra Streisand	Through Sony Pictures Releasing

=== Others ===
Producer

Year	Title	Director	Distributor	Notes
1977	Black Joy	Anthony Simmons	Hemdale Film Corporation	Uncredited
1977	The Accuser	Jean-Louis Bertuccelli		Co-producer
1979	Dizengoff 99	Avi Nesher	Shapira Films	
1989	Big Man on Campus	Jeremy Kagan	Vestron Pictures	
1990	Pretty Woman	Garry Marshall	Buena Vista Pictures	
1993	Striking Distance	Rowdy Herrington	Columbia Pictures	
2000	Up at the Villa	Philip Haas	USA Films	
2014	Noah	Darren Aronofsky	Paramount Pictures	
2015	The Big Short	Adam McKay	Paramount Pictures	
2020	His House	Remi Weekes	Netflix	
2022	The Northman	Robert Eggers	Focus Features / Universal Pictures	
2022	Deep Water	Adrian Lyne	Hulu / Amazon Prime Video	
2023	The Bikeriders	Jeff Nichols	Focus Features / Universal Pictures	
2024	Blitz	Steve McQueen	Apple TV+	

Executive producer

Year	Title	Director	Distributor
1978	The Medusa Touch	Jack Gold	ITC Entertainment
2018	The Girl in the Spider's Web	Fede Álvarez	Sony Pictures Releasing
2019	The Lighthouse	Robert Eggers	A24 / Focus Features / Universal Pictures
2019	Little Women	Greta Gerwig	Sony Pictures Releasing
2021	Everybody's Talking About Jamie	Jonathan Butterell	Amazon Studios
2023	Occupied City	Steve McQueen	A24 / mk2 Films

Miscellaneous crew

Year	Title	Role
1977	Black Joy	Presenter
1978	The Medusa Touch	In association with
1985	Brazil	Presenter
1987	Man on Fire	Presenter

Actor

Year	Title	Role
1983	Can She Bake a Cherry Pie?	Customer at Café
1984	Once Upon a Time in America	Chauffeur

Special thanks

- The Killing Floor (2007)

=== Television ===
Executive producer

- Free Willy (1994)
- The Client (1995−96)
- Michael Hayes (1997)
- Noriega: God's Favorite (2000) (TV movie)
- L.A. Confidential (2019) (TV pilot)
- The Beast Must Die (2020−21) (Co-executive producer)
- The Edge of Sleep (2024)

Producer

- Masada (1981) (Supervising producer)
- The Hunt for the Unicorn Killer (1999) (TV movie)

== See also ==
- List of billionaires
