= Ek Ajnabee =

2005 Indian film by Apoorva Lakhia

- Theatrical release poster
- Directed by: Apoorva Lakhia
- Screenplay by: Manoj Tyagi; Apoorva Lakhia
- Story by: Manoj Tyagi
- Based on: Man on Fire by A. J. Quinnell
- Produced by: Bunty Walia; Jaspreet Singh Walia
- Starring: Amitabh Bachchan; Arjun Rampal; Perizaad Zorabian; Kelly Dorji
- Cinematography: Gururaj R. Jois
- Edited by: Steven H. Bernard
- Music by: Vishal–Shekhar; Amar Mohile
- Production company: G. S. Entertainment Pvt. Ltd.
- Distributed by: Eros International
- Release date: 9 December 2005
- Running time: 143 minutes
- Country: India
- Language: Hindi

Ek Ajnabee – A Man Apart (transl. A Stranger) is a 2005 Indian Hindi-language action-thriller film directed by Apoorva Lakhia. The film stars Amitabh Bachchan, Arjun Rampal and Perizaad Zorabian. It is a remake of Tony Scott's Man on Fire, a film based on a novel of the same name, which was also adapted into another film in 1987.

Ek Ajnabee was released theatrically on 9 December 2005.

== Plot ==
Colonel Suryaveer "Surya" Singh is a bitter man and ex-Army officer, hired by his friend and former comrade Captain Shekhar Verma to protect a little girl, Anamika R. Rathore, who resides in Bangkok, Thailand with her Non-resident Indian (NRI) family. He is an alcoholic and is not interested in befriending the girl. Eventually, she wins his heart, and he helps her to prepare for a swim meet.

One day Anamika gets kidnapped, and Surya receives serious injuries in his attempt to prevent the kidnapping. Her father is not able to pay the sum to release his daughter. So Suryaveer uses all his skills to save the life of the child, only to find out about the conspiracy that is behind the little girl's kidnapping. Surya learns that Chang, Ravi’s lawyer, is behind some of this. The real mastermind behind this is Chang's brother. Surya holds Chang hostage, while Chang's brother holds Anamika hostage. When they come to exchange the people, Chang's brother then reveals a great secret to Surya. Surya learns that Shekhar was behind the kidnappings. Shekhar tells Surya that he all he cares about is money, and only wanted him to do the dirty work of eliminating all his enemies and that's why he got him involved in Bangkok, and despite Shekhar trying to send him away once the job was done, Surya chose his fate to die now at Shekhar's hands, by choosing to return to help Anamika. Surya kills Chang's brother's men. A fight between Shekhar and Surya ensues and Shekhar is killed, and Surya spends the rest of his life with Anamika and her mother.

In the end, it is shown that Anamika has a new bodyguard, with Surya as her mentor 15 years later.

== Cast ==
- Amitabh Bachchan as Col. Suryaveer "Surya" Singh
- Arjun Rampal as Captain Shekhar Verma
- Baby Rucha Vaidya as Anamika R. Rathore
- Perizaad Zorabian as Nikasha R. Rathore
- Vikram Chatwal as Ravi Rathore
- Daya Shankar Pandey as Kripa "Krispi" Shankar
- Akhilendra Mishra as ACP Harvinder "Harry" Singh
- Aditya Lakhia as Sandeep 'Sammy' Joshi
- Denzil Smith as Lee Kap
- Rajendranath "Raj" Zutshi as Wong
- Kelly Dorjee as Bangkok Police Officer Inspector Kelly
- Abhishek Bachchan as Bodyguard (special appearance)
- Lara Dutta as Adult Anamika
- Sanjay Dutt as Hip-Hop MC in the song "They Don't Know" (special appearance)

== Production ==
Apoorva Lakhia said that the script was written with the lead actor, Amitabh Bachchan, in mind." Lakhia explained that "Man on Fire has been made into four films in five different languages. [sic] So this is the Indian version. It has all the necessary ingredients required for a movie to come out of India." Vikram Chatwal, who plays Ravi Rathore in the film, said, "People talk a lot about cross cultural films. These films don't necessarily have to be like Monsoon Wedding or Bend It Like Beckham. This is not another Hindi film. This is not a remake of Man on Fire. If you see the way it is shot, edited and directed, it is setting new standards. Mr Bachchan is reinventing himself. So please don't turn this film into another Bollywood film."

The film was shot on location in Bangkok, Thailand, for 35 days. Lakhia said that he and Bunty Walia, a producer, chose Bangkok because "we wanted our characters to stand out. When they are walking on the street, they will look different. Both my heroes are over six feet, and Thai men are not as tall. So it was really important to be in a place where they could stand out."

== Soundtrack ==
Ek Ajnabee

Soundtrack album by Vishal-Shekhar Amar Mohile
- Released: 17 November 2005
- Genre: Feature film soundtrack
- Label: T-Series

The film's music was composed by Vishal–Shekhar and Amar Mohile, with lyrics written by Sameer, Vishal Dadlani, Jaideep Sahni, and Lalit Tiwari.

=== Review ===
Vipin Vijayan of Rediff.com said, "The film's music is funky and may soon rock discotheques."

=== Track listing ===
#	Title	Singer(s)	Lyrics	Composer	Length
1	"Barf Khushi Hai"	Kailash Kher	Jaideep Sahni	Vishal–Shekhar	05:14
2	"Ek Ajnabi (Mama Told Me)"	Sunidhi Chauhan, Sukhwinder Singh, Vishal Dadlani	Vishal Dadlani	Vishal-Shekhar	06:01
3	"Soniye"	Sunidhi Chauhan, KK	Sameer	Amar Mohile	05:57
4	"Stranger On The Prowl"	Shilpa Rao	Sameer	Amar Mohile	04:14
5	"Tere Liye Meri"	Kunal Ganjawala, Clinton Cerejo	Sameer	Vishal - Shekhar	04:50
6	"They Dont Know"	Kunal Ganjawala	Lalit Tiwari	Amar Mohile	04:00
7	"Blast U Between Ur Eyes (Remix)"	Kunal Ganjawala	Lalit Tiwari	Amar Mohile	04:24
8	"Soniye (Mix N Match Remix)"	Sunidhi Chauhan, KK	Sameer	Amar Mohile	04:49
9	"Tere Liye Meri (Part 2)"	Kunal Ganjawala	Sameer	Vishal-Shekhar	04:47

== Reception ==
=== Critical response ===
Manish Gajjar of BBC Shropshire wrote, "Overall, this thriller is a must-see if you are an Amitabh fan." Vipin Vijayan of Rediff.com said that the film "reinvents Vijay Dinanath Chauhan (Bachchan's very popular character in Agneepath)," and that the film has "a racy first" act but that it "loses steam in the second half."

Bunty Walia, the producer, said that there had been accusations that the film had been plagiarised. He said "To our credit, [Apoorva Lakhia] and I never hid the fact that Ek Ajnabee was adapted from Man on Fire. Quite unlike some others who borrow blindly and presume others are blind to their intentions."

In 2006 the Academy of Motion Picture Arts and Sciences stated an interest in acquiring a copy of the Ek Ajnabee screenplay for its collection. Walia said that this was an "honour" after the plagiarism accusations. Subhash K. Jha of the Hindustan Times said, "Isn't it ironical that the Americans want a copy of a script, which is straightaway inspired by the Hollywood film Man on Fire?"

=== Box office ===
In the United Kingdom, the film was screened in 20 cinemas during its opening weekend, making £35,058, with an average of £1,757 per showing. Manish Gajjar of BBC Shropshire said, "It has not done so well in the UK cinemas."
