= Man on Fire (Quinnell novel) =

1980 thriller novel by A. J. Quinnell

- Cover of the first edition
- Author: Philip Nicholson, writing as A. J. Quinnell
- Language: English
- Series: Creasy
- Genre: Thriller
- Publisher: William Morrow
- Publication date: September 1980
- Publication place: United Kingdom
- Media type: Print (hardback and paperback)
- Pages: 284 pp
- ISBN: 0-688-03743-7
- OCLC: 6305089
- Dewey Decimal: 813/.54
- LC Class: PS3567.U36 M3
- Followed by: The Perfect Kill

Man on Fire is a 1980 thriller novel by the English novelist Philip Nicholson, writing as A. J. Quinnell. The plot features his popular character Marcus Creasy, an American-born former member of the French Foreign Legion and mercenary, in his first appearance.

== Plot ==
In Italy, wealthy families often hire bodyguards to protect family members from the threat of kidnapping. When Rika Balletto urges her husband Ettore, a wealthy textiles producer living in Milan, to hire a bodyguard for their daughter Pinta, he is doubtful but agrees. After some searching, he finally settles for an American named Creasy.

Creasy, once a purposeful and lethal sergeant in the French Foreign Legion and now a mercenary, has become a depressed and burnt-out alcoholic. To keep him occupied, his companion Guido suggests that Creasy should get a job and offers to set him up as a bodyguard. Thus, he is hired by the Ballettos, where he meets his charge, Pinta.

Creasy barely tolerates the precocious child and her pestering questions about him and his life. But slowly, she chips away at his seemingly impenetrable exterior, his defences drop, and he opens up to her. They become friends and he replaces her parents in their absences, giving her advice, guidance and help with her competition running: he is even spurred to give up his drinking and return to his former physical prowess. But Creasy's life is shattered when Pinta is kidnapped by the Mafia, despite his efforts to protect her.

Creasy is wounded during the kidnapping and as he lies in a hospital bed Guido keeps him informed of the goings on. Soon enough, Guido returns with the news that the exchange went bad and Pinta was found dead in a car, suffocated on her own vomit. She had also been raped by her captors.

Out of hospital, Creasy returns to Guido's pensione and outlines his plans for revenge against the men who took away the girl who convinced him it was all right to live again: anyone who was involved, or profited from it, all the way to the top of the Mafia. Told by Guido he can stay with in-laws on the island of Gozo in Malta, Creasy accepts the offer, to train for his new mission.

While on Gozo, Creasy trains for several months, getting into shape and re-familiarizing himself with weaponry. But, to his surprise, he also discovers he has another reason to live after his suicidal mission against the Mafia: he finds himself accepted by and admiring the Gozitans, as well as falling in love with Nadia, the daughter of his host.

Soon enough, he is fit and leaves for Marseille where he stocks up on supplies, weapons and ammunition: from there he travels back to Italy and then the war between Creasy and the Mafia begins. From low-level enforcers to the capos in Milan and Rome, as well as all the way to the head Don in Sicily, Creasy cuts through their organisation, killing anyone who had something even remotely to do with Pinta's kidnapping. After Creasy reveals to Rika that Ettore allowed Pinta to be kidnapped for the insurance money, Ettore commits suicide. Finally, after killing the Don, a severely wounded Creasy is taken to hospital, but pronounced dead: a funeral is held and Creasy is thought to be gone.

But, unknown to all, Creasy was in fact alive and makes it back to Gozo where he is reunited with Nadia.

== Characters ==
- Marcus Creasy – The protagonist of the novel. Creasy was born on 15 April 1930 – 1933 in Tennessee. Creasy grew up in poor family and was orphaned at an early age. He joined US Marines when he was 17 years old. Creasy first showed his talent for fighting in the Korean War, but was dishonorably discharged from Marines for striking a senior officer, who let many soldiers die. Creasy served in the 1st Foreign Parachute Regiment of French Foreign Legion, during which he fought in Indochina and Algeria. After dissolution of 1er REP Creasy participated in several armed conflicts in Africa as a mercenary and combat operations as part of a secret CIA unit in Vietnam, Laos and Cambodia. He also trained soldiers in hand-to-hand combat, firearms and tactics. Devastated, tired of life and constant battles, Creasy quits his job as a mercenary during his participation in Rhodesian Bush War as a member of the Selous Scouts and becomes Pinta's bodyguard. A. J. Quinnell based Creasy on several people he knew from Africa and Vietnam in the 1960s and 1970s. He imagined that Creasy would look like Robert Mitchum.
- Ettore Balletto – The husband of the Balletto family and the owner of Balletto Mills, one of Italy's largest producers of knitted silk fabric. He arranged a kidnapping of Pinta to commit an insurance scam: he set up an insurance policy at Lloyd's of London for two billion lire. After Creasy confronts him and exposes him to Rika, Ettore commits suicide in his eighth floor office.
- Rika Balletto – The wife of the Balletto family.
- Pinta Balletto – The child of the Balletto family. A smart, cheerful, and kind girl who became Creasy's friend and brought light into his life.
- Guido Arrellio – Creasy's friend and the owner of the Pensione Splendide in Naples. Guido was a gangster in Naples, before joining French Foreign Legion. Guido fought alongside Creasy in Algeria, Congo, Angola, Biafra, Vietnam and Laos. After marrying Julia, Guido decided to leave the life of a mercenary and opened his own Pensione.
- Maria – The cook at the Balletto house.
- Deluca (Signora Deluca) – Pinta's schoolteacher.
- Giorgio Rabbia – One of Pinta's kidnappers, he works as the driver in the kidnapping.
- Giacomo Sandri – One of Pinta's kidnappers: he is Fossella's sister's son. He shoots Creasy during the kidnapping.
- Cremasco and Dorigo – Two of Pinta's kidnappers. During the kidnapping, Creasy kills them before being wounded out of commission.
- Dino Fossella – One of the two main Milan-based mafia bosses of Cantarella's organisation who planned about Pinta's kidnapping. Creasy kills him by placing a bomb in his rectum and detonating it.
- Abrata – One of the two main Milan-based mafia bosses of Cantarella's organization who planned about Pinta's kidnapping.
- Joey Schembri – The younger brother of Julia, Guido's wife: Julia died in a drunk driving crash before the start of the story.
- Paul Schembri – Julia, Nadia and Joey's father who works as a farmer in Gozo.
- Laura Schembri – Paul's wife and the mother of Julia, Nadia and Joey.
- Nadia Schembri – Julia's sister, Nadia becomes Creasy's girlfriend. Creasy impregnates Nadia and Creasy returns to live with Nadia in Gozo.
- Vico Mansutti – The lawyer for the Balletto family, Vico serves as a go-between in Pinta's kidnapping scheme, between Ettore and the mafia. Creasy wires a plastique to his car, so Vico dies when he starts his car.
- Gina Mansutti – Vico's wife.
- Mario Satta – A member of the Carabinieri tracking Creasy's movements.
- Massimo Bellu – Satta's assistant.
- Elio – Elio is Guido's younger brother.
- Felicia – Elio's wife.
- Pietro – An ex-thief who works as an employee at Guido's pensione.
- Cantarella – The boss of the entire mafia organisation, who is based out of Palermo, Sicily.
- Floriano Conti – A mafia boss in Rome and a member of Cantarella's organisation. Creasy uses an anti-tank missile to kill Conti.
- "Wally" Wighman – An Australian who Creasy meets in Rome.
- "Paddy" Collins – An Australian who Creasy meets in Rome.
- Franco Masi – An owner of a farmhouse next to Villa Colacci, Cantarella's stronghold. Cantarella and the previous occupants served as Masi's benefactor: after Cantarella ordered the destruction of Masi's property, Masi gained a grudge against Cantarella.
- Cesare Gravelli – One of Cantarella's main advisors.
- Maurizio Dicandia – One of Cantarella's main advisors.
- Amelia Zanbon – Sandri's 15-year-old companion.

== Development ==
Two real-life incidents shaped A. J. Quinnell's development of the book. In the first, after the eldest son of a rich Singaporean was kidnapped by Triads for ransom money, the man refused to pay the ransom, leading to the death of his son; the refusal meant that the man's other children would not become targets. The second was the kidnapping of John Paul Getty III, the grandson of Paul Getty, in Rome.

On a previous occasion, Quinnell had helped save the life of an Italian man suffering a medical emergency on an airliner flight between Tokyo and Hong Kong. When he began doing research for the book, he contacted the man's family. The family responded by introducing anti-mafia investigators, lawyers, and mafia members to Quinnell. The contacts eagerly helped Quinnell and asked to be named in the book.

On the island of Gozo, Quinnell often frequented a Maltese bar called "Gleneagles". Several patrons at the bar agreed to be characters in the book.

== Reception ==
After the book's publication in 1981, Man on Fire became a best seller. By 2005 Man on Fire sold over eight million paperback copies and received many translations. Many of the book's most devoted fans came from Japan. The Times of Malta obituary of A. J. Quinnell stated that the Japanese liked Creasy's "samurai-style dedication". Japanese people saw Creasy as a "ronin", a disgraced former samurai, who tries to atone for his deeds with charitable acts. Because of the Japanese popularity of the book, Malta received its first significant wave of Japanese tourism. As of 2005, due to the popularity of Quinnell's books, an early edition of Man on Fire had a price tag of £63 (£111.41 when adjusted for inflation).

Anatole Broyard stated that the writing is done "well", that the characters of Creasy and Satta are "appealing", and that the story type is "satisfying"; Broyard compared this work to Congo and argued that, compared to Congo there is not as much "flair", but more "traditional virtues, or lack of virtue, of the suspense novel."

Barbara Conaty, previously an employee of Madison Public Library, wrote in a review that it is "suspensful and realistic"; she criticised how the narration is "omniscient".

== Sequels ==
Quinnell wrote four more novels featuring Creasy.

- The Perfect Kill (1992)
  - In this novel, Nadia and the four-year old daughter of Creasy and Nadia die on Pan Am Flight 103. Creasy enlists a man to help him kill a person responsible for the act. Martha Gellhorn of The Daily Telegraph gave the book two stars and described it as "imaginative, well-written". Andrew Flynn of the Huddersfield Daily Examiner stated that, because the plot is based on a real aircraft bombing, the work is "of doubtful taste"; Flynn stated that the story is "gripping". The Croydon Advertiser wrote that the book is "gripping" and that Creasy's "determination", along with the title "The Perfect Kill," emotionally "chill" people.
- The Blue Ring (1993)
  - The Croydon Advertiser described the story as "tough, pacy". Janice Lynn of the East Kilbride News wrote that the book, like others by the same author, is "excellent".
- Black Horn (1994)
  - Reviewer D.E. from the Stirling Observer wrote that the book is "tense, taut" but that the issue is that it "rushes and underplays", which the review expressed disappointment for. Reviewer MR from the South Wales Evening Post stated that the book is "outstanding" with a "fast but furious" character.
- Message From Hell (1996)
  - Reviewer D.E. from the Stirling Observer wrote that the book is "fast and formidable". Bolton Evening News wrote that the work is "taut yet thoughtful". The Northern Echo stated that it demonstrates the author "at his high-octane best". The North-West Evening Mail wrote that the book is "taut and tense".

== Films ==
There were two film adaptations made from this novel, one in 1987 starring Scott Glenn and again in 2004 starring Denzel Washington.

The 2004 film was remade the following year in Hindi language as Ek Ajnabee and in Tamil language as Aanai.

== Television series ==
In March 2023, Netflix ordered a television series adaptation of the novel with Kyle Killen as writer and executive producer. Netflix released the seven episodes of the series on 30 April 2026.
