= 7th Heaven season 6 =

7th Heaven
- Season 6
- DVD cover
- No. of episodes: 22

Release
- Original network: The WB
- Original release: September 24, 2001 – May 20, 2002

Season chronology
- ← Previous; Season 5 Next → Season 7

The sixth season of 7th Heaven—an American family-drama television series, created and produced by Brenda Hampton—premiered on September 24, 2001, on The WB, and concluded on May 20, 2002 (22 episodes). This is the last season in which Jessica Biel is considered a main cast member.

== Cast and characters ==
- Stephen Collins as Eric Camden
- Catherine Hicks as Annie Camden
- Barry Watson as Matt Camden
- David Gallagher as Simon Camden
- Jessica Biel as Mary Camden
- Beverley Mitchell as Lucy Camden
- Mackenzie Rosman as Ruthie Camden
- Nikolas and Lorenzo Brino as Sam and David Camden
- Adam LaVorgna as Robbie Palmer
- Happy as Happy the Dog

=== Recurring ===
- Sarah Danielle Madison as Sarah Glass-Camden (episodes 15-22)

== Episodes ==
No. overall	No. in season	Title	Directed by	Written by	Original release date	Prod. code	Viewers (millions)
111	1	"Changes"	Burt Brinckerhoff	Brenda Hampton	September 24, 2001	62006-06-111	8.34
Eric's stress level rises when he learns that Matt has lost his job at the hospital and is relying on his pals to find him new work. Simon adds to the tension by pressuring Eric to let him get his learner's permit. Lucy just cries in her room and refuses to discuss what happened in New York between her and Jeremy. Even lodger Robbie, still longing for Mary, is moping around the house. To top it all off, Annie's odd behavior has Eric wondering what is going on with her.
112	2	"Teased"	Tony Mordente	Brenda Hampton	October 1, 2001	62006-06-112	8.52
Simon stands up for a bullied student only to have the boy tell him that he will shoot his tormentors. Robbie gives Ruthie a playful nickname and she comes up with a less pleasant one for Lucy. Meanwhile Lucy snaps at Ruthie and teases her about the nickname, unwittingly causing a rift in Ruthie and Robbie's relationship. Eric gets a visit from an old female friend with her own family issues.
113	3	"Sympathy"	Joel J. Feigenbaum	Brenda Hampton	October 8, 2001	62006-06-113	8.68
Simon considers dating a 16-year-old pregnant girl he meets on a bus. Annie accepts Robbie's offer to rent the room over the Camdens' garage that both Lucy and Matt wanted. Meanwhile, a stranger appears to injure himself in the Camden garage.
114	4	"Work"	David J. Plenn	Sue Tenney	October 15, 2001	62006-06-114	9.28
Eric tries to arrange a romantic evening alone with Annie, but she rebukes his every attempt; Simon's tardiness and poor people skills put his new job in jeopardy; Robbie sets Lucy up with one of his friends; and Matt is concerned about a woman who keeps appearing at the clinic.
115	5	"Relationships"	Burt Brinckerhoff	Sue Tenney	October 22, 2001	62006-06-115	8.25
As Annie starts teaching, she inadvertently gives a student bad advice. At the same time, Eric and Annie painfully discover how much their constant arguing is affecting the family. Meanwhile, Lucy and Robbie finally face up to their feelings after she intentionally sabotages one of his dates out of jealousy; Cheryl comes to Eric for guidance in her relationship with Matt, but she misinterprets his input; Simon is attracted to Lynn (Kaley Cuoco), who is already dating one of his friends; while Mary considers Wilson's marriage proposal, she has a romantic encounter with a fellow firefighter-trainee.
116	6	"Broken"	Tony Mordente	Sue Tenney	November 5, 2001	62006-06-116	7.84
Simon meets up with former girlfriend Sasha and they catch up on each other's personal lives; Lucy and Robbie argue over who should tell Mary about their emerging relationship; Matt worries that a young woman in his study group is being abused by her belligerent boyfriend; Julie and her toddler show up at the house and annoy Annie as she prepares a lesson for her class.
117	7	"Prodigal"	Harry Harris	Brenda Hampton & Erik Kolbell	November 12, 2001	62006-06-117	8.58
Mary suddenly returns to the already-crowded Camden house and tells her family that she is home to stay, and everybody wonders what happened between her and Wilson: Are they married? Did they break up? Only Mary knows, and she isn't telling--at least, not yet. Her presence delights Annie, who goes out of her way to make her comfortable, even offering her the coveted garage apartment. But Ruthie feels that Mary should apologize to everyone for the actions that led to her being sent away to Buffalo.
118	8	"Ay Carumba"	Paul Snider	Brenda Hampton	November 19, 2001	62006-06-118	8.29
Matt, Lucy, Simon, and Ruthie are banished to the garage apartment after protesting Annie's decision to give it to Mary, and they soon start voting one another out as each vies for sole ownership; Robbie is nervous about meeting his new girlfriend's parents; and Mary finally reveals what happened to her and Wilson and starts to make amends to her family.
119	9	"Lost"	Burt Brinckerhoff	Story by : Chris Olsen & Jeff Olsen; Teleplay by : Brenda Hampton	November 26, 2001	62006-06-119	7.91
Mary and Lucy ask their parents to find both of them new boyfriends/potential husbands; Robbie argues about spending so much time with Joy when she insists on seeing him right away; Simon and Matt use the twins to attract women.
120	10	"Consideration"	Tony Mordente	Sue Tenney	December 10, 2001	62006-06-120	7.22
Annie's father shows up for a weekend visit that Eric forgot to tell her about, and nearly everyone is too busy to spend time with him, so he takes Simon driving, and they wind up in a low speed car chase; Eric lies to Annie about his plans for the day, which includes a trip to the Glenoak Hospital.
121	11	"Pathetic"	Bradley Gross	Brenda Hampton & Jeffrey Rodgers	January 14, 2002	62006-06-121	6.95
Annie quits her teaching job without discussing it with Eric; Mary calls Wilson and his landlord says he has moved out of his apartment; Simon uses Robbie's car to practice driving and accidentally smashes into Matt's vehicle, which finally prompts Robbie to confront Matt about his relationship with the Camdens.
122	12	"Suspicion"	Joel J. Feigenbaum	Elaine Arata	January 21, 2002	62006-06-122	8.05
The Camden family tries to help a young friend of Ruthie's in this examination of religious intolerance. After various personal effects disappear from the house, the family finds Ruthie in the garage apartment entertaining a friend with the pilfered items. The would-be bandit explains that she is hiding her pal from a pair of older boys who have been harassing her because of her Muslim background. Touched by her plight, Mary and Lucy try to get their neighbors to sign a petition in support of the girl's family, but Matt and Simon decide on a less-civic solution of hunting down the perpetrators, which could have severe consequences for Matt.
123	13	"Drunk"	Burt Brinckerhoff	Sue Tenney	February 4, 2002	62006-06-123	8.43
Simon persuades his parents to let him go to a party after they meet his friend, a senior who promises to look after him, but he comes home drunk and his siblings attempt to help him--except Mary, who worries that he's headed down the same path she wandered down the year before; Matt hesitates to open mail from two medical schools to which he applied; Mary and Lucy take the same classes at an area college, and Mary isn't happy about Lucy's friends and Lucy isn't happy about that.
124	14	"Hot Pants"	Tony Mordente	Sue Tenney	February 11, 2002	62006-06-124	7.26
Valentine's Day delivers the Camdens some surprises: a grounded Simon is asked out by Maria, a senior; Annie's attempt to surprise Eric with romantic plans backfires and results in a big fight; nosy Mary discovers Robbie's plans with Joy; Lucy runs into her ex-fiancé Jeremy outside her classroom and finds out that he's headed to meet a "friend" at the pool hall; Mary discovers that Wilson's new girlfriend is her friend Corey Conway; Matt seeks Eric's help with his love life because he wants to get serious with a girl--which leads him to seek out old girlfriends to find out where their relationships went wrong; and Ruthie's friend has tricked her into asking out a boy she's already dating.
125	15	"I Really Do" (Part 1)	Burt Brinckerhoff	Brenda Hampton	February 25, 2002	62006-06-125	7.83
Determined to settle down before heading off to medical school, Matt searches for a woman to marry, and talks with a doctor he works with about wanting a lifelong soulmate; meanwhile he catches the eye of co-worker Sarah Glass, daughter of Rosina and Rabbi Richard Glass. After Ruthie warns Matt not to do "anything stupid," Matt and Sarah don't come home after their second date in 24 hours, causing both families great concern.
126	16	"I Really Did" (Part 2)	Stephen Collins	Brenda Hampton	March 4, 2002	62006-06-126	8.25
Matt stays out all night with Sarah and they secretly elope, but when facing their parents, they can only summon the courage to say they're engaged. Eric is convinced Matt did something foolish and Annie worriedly tries to calm him. Meanwhile, Lucy and Mary suspect that Ruthie knows what Matt really did on his night out; and Ruthie and Matt agree to keep the marriage a secret until a Jewish ceremony is performed in a few months.
127	17	"Lip Service"	Joel J. Feigenbaum	Paul Perlove	April 15, 2002	62006-06-127	6.70
Annie frantically cooks Jewish dishes to bring to the Glasses' Shabbat dinner; Simon asks Matt and Sarah if he can bring his half-Jewish friend Morris to the dinner (although he's not the most knowledgeable about his faith). Lucy and Mary fake illness so they can stay home with Robbie--it works and Mary flirts madly with Robbie; during the dinner, Eric and Annie are shocked to find out that Matt is considering converting to Judaism.
128	18	"The Ring"	Tony Mordente	Sue Tenney & Chad Byrnes	April 22, 2002	62006-06-128	6.87
Matt and Sarah argue over their wedding plans and their agreement to forgo buying an engagement ring, then seek Eric's advice, but he's not happy about the engagement in the first place; Matt ends up buying Sarah a fake engagement ring. Mary and Lucy fly to Buffalo--Lucy thinks it's for the weekend, while Mary makes her own plans; a police officer named Kevin confiscates Lucy's bag and invites her and Mary on a double-date with him and his brother, who turns out to be Ben.
129	19	"Letting Go"	Joel J. Feigenbaum	Brenda Hampton	April 29, 2002	62006-06-129	6.89
A startled Eric catches Mary and Lucy in the kitchen with two guys in the middle of the night; the guys, Kevin and Ben, spend the night in the living room with the girls. Ben and Kevin's sister Patty-Mary calls the house to tell them their mom is going out with a neighbor. Eric suspects that Ruthie knows something about Matt and Sarah, and he himself wonders if they're married already. Meanwhile, Sam and David get big-boy beds; and an older couple seeks guidance from Eric when their 45-year-old son Jeremiah runs away from home.
130	20	"The Known Soldier"	Burt Brinckerhoff	Brenda Hampton	May 6, 2002	62006-06-130	7.67
In this very special episode, all the Camdens become emotionally attached to Ruthie's new project of corresponding by e-mail with a Marine in Afghanistan, sharing humorous and poignant stories about her family with her new penfriend. An unexpected tragedy brings even more perspective to the situation and prompts everyone to get out and make a difference. Note: This episode is based on the real-life plight of Sergeant Dwight J. Morgan from the United States Marine Corps. Ernest Borgnine makes a cameo appearance.
131	21	"Holy War: Part 1"	Tony Mordente	Sue Tenney	May 13, 2002	62006-06-131	7.42
Matt discusses wedding plans with Eric and Rabbi Glass and makes a spontaneous decision that infuriates Eric and creates tension between the two families; Annie tries to plan the perfect rehearsal dinner; Annie's father and stepmother fly in for a visit but get lost at the airport; Simon is angry that Matt doesn't choose him to be his best man; Ruthie gets into an unexpected fight with Robbie' Lucy argues with her boyfriend over moving arrangements; Aunt Julie goes into labor.
132	22	"Holy War: Part 2"	Tony Mordente	Sue Tenney	May 20, 2002	62006-06-132	8.38
Matt and Eric's relationship further erodes when Eric refuses to attend the wedding; Matt and Sarah finally ask their mothers to help restore peace in their families, so Annie calls the Colonel to talk sense into Eric; Ben and Kevin come to Glenoak to patch things up with Mary and Lucy; Robbie tries to figure out the real reason why Ruthie's so upset with him.
