= 7th Heaven season 8 =

7th Heaven
- Season 8
- DVD cover
- No. of episodes: 23

Release
- Original network: The WB
- Original release: September 15, 2003 – May 17, 2004

Season chronology
- ← Previous; Season 7 Next → Season 9

The eighth season of 7th Heaven—an American family-drama television series created and produced by Brenda Hampton—premiered on September 15, 2003, on The WB, and concluded on May 17, 2004 (23 episodes).

== Cast and characters ==
=== Main ===
- Stephen Collins as Eric Camden
- Catherine Hicks as Annie Camden
- Beverley Mitchell as Lucy Camden-Kinkirk
- Mackenzie Rosman as Ruthie Camden
- Nikolas and Lorenzo Brino as Sam and David Camden (21 episodes)
- George Stults as Kevin Kinkirk
- Ashlee Simpson as Cecilia Smith
- Rachel Blanchard as Roxanne Richardson
- Jeremy London as Chandler Hampton
- Scotty Leavenworth as Peter Petrowski
- Tyler Hoechlin as Martin Brewer
- Happy as Happy the Dog

=== Recurring ===
- David Gallagher as Simon Camden (7 episodes)
- Barry Watson as Matt Camden (5 episodes)
- Jessica Biel as Mary Camden (1 episode)
- Kyle Searles as Mac (6 episodes)
- Shannon Kenny as Paris Petrowik (8)
- Richard Lewis as Rabbi Rickard Glass (3)
- Brad Mauleas George Smith (5)
- Christopher Michael Detective Michaels (8)
- Bryan Callen as George 'Vic' Vickery Petrowski (7)
- Carlos Ponce as Carlos Rivara (5)

== Episodes ==
No. overall	No. in season	Title	Directed by	Written by	Original release date	Prod. code	Viewers (millions)
155	1	"The Long Bad Summer" (Part 1)	Joel J. Feigenbaum	Brenda Hampton	September 15, 2003	62006-08-155	8.08
The Camdens are at their beach house on their most-depressing family vacation: Simon is crushed after unintentionally killing a classmate in a car accident, and as everyone tries to help him through, they all have their own problems and concerns. Kevin and Lucy ponder whether they are ready to have children; Ruthie's boyfriend Peter starts spending increasing amounts of time with the Camdens, even tagging along on their vacation; Ruthie learns a huge secret about Mary; and Simon's painful ordeal strains his parents' marriage.
156	2	"An Early Fall" (Part 2)	Joel J. Feigenbaum	Brenda Hampton	September 22, 2003	62006-08-156	8.69
Mary makes a surprise visit home to deliver unexpected news to her parents; Kevin and Lucy adjust to married life; Simon tells Cecilia he needs space; Roxanne's little confession leads to the demise of her and Chandler's relationship; Eric ponders Simon's academic future when he refuses to go back for his senior year; Annie prepares for a potentially-dangerous dinner engagement.
157	3	"PK (Preacher's Kid)"	Harry Harris	Brenda Hampton	September 29, 2003	62006-08-157	7.24
Eric accompanies Simon to a California State Board of Education meeting to try to secure him an early high-school graduation, and Simon discovers that his new advisor is a fellow preacher's son. Simon plans to take the CHSPE to start college early. Kevin is tricked into babysitting Detective Michaels' 6-year-old granddaughter, and Cecilia watches over the twins. Meanwhile, Lucy sees Chandler kissing an attractive woman in church and wonders whether Roxanne should know, and Peter tries to protect Ruthie from a bully.
158	4	"I Wasn't Expecting That!"	David Jones	Paul Perlove	October 6, 2003	62006-08-158	7.41
Mysterious teenager Martin (Tyler Hoechlin) wanders into the Camden home and spends time with the family. Meanwhile, Matt's father-in-law approaches Eric for advice about his troubled marriage; Kevin is humiliated after being attacked on the job by a woman during a domestic-violence dispute; Ruthie and Peter struggle to complete a school project, while Ruthie wonders why Peter always calls her "honey" or "sweetie"; and Simon is upset that nobody seems to care about his upcoming departure for college.
159	5	"Simon's Home Video" a.k.a. "The Kid Is Out of the Picture"	Deborah Raffin	Chris Olsen & Jeff Olsen	October 13, 2003	62006-08-159	6.81
Simon prepares a video-essay to go with his application for early admission to college. This lets him finally open up about the devastating past few months of his life as he discusses his future plans, reveals unique information about his family, and reflects on his distinctive relationship with each one.
160	6	"Charity Begins at Home"	Karen Arthur	Sue Tenney	October 20, 2003	62006-08-160	7.15
During his Sunday sermon, Eric proposes that instead of a financial contribution, everyone should make a commitment to reach out and help someone in need. Kevin and Lucy argue over where to volunteer their time, while Ruthie learns a secret about a shy, withdrawn classmate. Elsewhere, Eric calls new son-in-law Carlos and asks him to fly in for dinner with Mary; Annie is jealous that the twins are bonding so much with Cecilia; and old feelings resurface between Chandler and Roxanne, who keep running into each other.
161	7	"Getting to Know You"	Harry Harris	Sue Tenney	November 3, 2003	62006-08-161	6.79
Eric and Annie throw a "Welcome to the Neighborhood" party for Ruthie's Muslim friend Jill Dupree (Randa Sabbah) and her parents (Kamal Marayati and Yareli Arizmendi), but the Duprees are hesitant to attend and Eric is shocked and disappointed when he learns that his neighborhood is far from Muslim-friendly. Meanwhile, Cecilia's house is robbed while she and her dad (Brad Maule) attend Kevin's first Neighborhood Watch meeting; Roxanne suspects that the troubled 16-year-old (A.J. Trauth) she mentors might be involved in the robbery; Chandler is attracted to Peter's mom Paris (Shannon Kenny).
162	8	"Baggage"	Harvey Laidman	Sue Tenney	November 10, 2003	62006-08-162	6.87
Eric arranges for Peter and his dog to visit a drug-rehab center to cheer up the patients, where Peter bonds with Nick (Joe Penny) and helps him reconnect with his estranged son. Meanwhile, uncoordinated Lucy finds out that Kevin has been secretly coaching the Glenoak Police Department husband-and-wife softball team and demands that he let her play; just before his first date with Paris, Chandler receives a letter from Roxanne telling him she still loves him; Martin confronts Cecilia about her lingering feelings for Simon, prompting her to call Simon and tell him she has a new boyfriend=-but Simon has news for her; Ruthie is jealous of Annie and Cecilia's close relationship.
163	9	"Go Ask Alice"	Joel J. Feigenbaum	Brenda Hampton & Shawn Kostanian	November 17, 2003	62006-08-163	7.85
The school board summons Eric to investigate high-school principal Ms. Jones (Meredith Baxter) when more than one concerned parent questions her behavior. When a female student disappears, all fingers point at Ms. Jones, but Eric believes strongly that the student's father may be the real culprit. Elsewhere, rumors about Martin upset Cecilia, who then regrets confiding in Ruthie.
164	10	"The One Thing"	Fred Einesman	Fred Einesman	November 24, 2003	62006-08-164	7.54
Matt and Sarah (Sarah Danielle Madison) begin their student rotation in the ER, but get off to a bad start by arriving late and angering Dr. Norton (Dennis Boutsikaris), the attending ER physician. Matt and Sarah's relationship is tested when Matt quickly demonstrates an aptitude for the work, but Sarah accuses him of trying to make himself look better than the other students, especially her, but he looks foolish when he can't figure out how to turn off his cell-phone ringer and gets stuck fielding calls from his family. His day ends tragically, leaving him to question his destiny.
165	11	"When Bad Conversations Happen to Good People"	Harry Harris	Brenda Hampton	January 5, 2004	62006-08-165	6.31
Matt returns home to tell Eric and Annie that Sarah has left him and he's dropping out of medical school, and Rabbi Glass offers Matt marital advice. Meanwhile, Kevin must decide whether to tell a very jealous Lucy that his ex-wife (Mindy Burbano) is in town and has invited them to dinner. Martin's aunt (Keri Lynn Pratt) asks Eric to talk Martin into moving to New York with her. Chandler asks Peter how he'd feel if he married Paris, and Peter is suspicious when his mother goes out of town on business. Ruthie keeps something from her mother.
166	12	"The Prodigal Father"	Harvey Laidman	Brenda Hampton	January 12, 2004	62006-08-166	5.87
A distraught Peter learns that his alcoholic, mean-spirited father Vic (Bryan Callen), who abandoned his family three years ago, has changed his ways and wants to be part of Peter's life again; Chandler must decide how this will impact his relationship with Paris and Peter. Meanwhile, Ruthie feels that Peter is pushing her away during this chaotic time, and Eric finds a philanthropic way for his family and community to embrace Vic.
167	13	"Major League"	Joel J. Feigenbaum	Sue Tenney	January 19, 2004	62006-08-167	5.54
Eric feels he must intervene when Martin, who recently moved in with the Camdens, is recruited by a professional baseball team, the Miami Gators, and considers dropping out of school. Meanwhile, Ruthie enlists Lucy's help to convince their mom to let her attend a couples party with Peter; Chandler's mother (Concetta Tomei) pays him an unwelcome visit when he is named executor of his father's estate; an angered Lucy causes a rift when she considers moving; Cecilia teaches Sam and David how to ride bikes.
168	14	"Healing Old Wounds"	Harry Harris	Brenda Hampton	January 26, 2004	62006-08-168	6.43
Martin's father, Bill Brewer, takes a short leave of absence from tour duty to return to Glenoak and talk to Martin about pursuing baseball instead of college and ends up making up with Roxanne; Meanwhile, with Paris's ex-husband Vic now back in the picture for Peter they re-evaluate their relationship; Roxanne gives her opinion on the war in Iraq.
169	15	"Don't Speak Ill of the Dead or the Living"	Joel J. Feigenbaum	Brenda Hampton	February 9, 2004	62006-08-169	6.11
Annie's half-sister Lily (Michelle Phillips) returns to discuss an important family matter involving their father, and Eric tries to figure out why Annie doesn't want to deal with her. Meanwhile, Cecilia sets Martin's friend Mac (Kyle Searles) up with a girl from school, but he refuses after remembering a horrifying moment from their grade-school years; Ruthie and Peter create a newspaper featuring false and derogatory stories about two former U.S. presidents; Roxanne turns to Chandler with a moral dilemma: she's keeping a secret about Det. Michaels from Kevin.
170	16	"The Anniversary"	Deborah Raffin	Sue Tenney	February 16, 2004	62006-08-170	6.08
When Matt returns to celebrate his special "secret" second anniversary with Ruthie, who tries to avoid seeing the rest of the family, as Matt doesn't want them to know he's in town, but Lucy find out and she, Eric, and Annie, trying to figure out why he's in town, visit the Glass in-laws. Meanwhile, Martin shares something special with Cecilia; Annie accidentally lets Nurse Kelly know that Matt and Sarah are married; Vic invites Paris to spend a special evening with him, but she doesn't want to go because she thinks he wants to propose--and she's right.
171	17	"Two Weddings, an Engagement, and a Funeral"	Harry Harris	Sue Tenney	February 23, 2004	62006-08-171	6.00
Annie's half-sister Lilly is getting married and wants their ailing father to walk her down the aisle, but Annie worries that it might be too much of an ordeal for him. However, she later finds out he died in his sleep. Meanwhile, Fred (Al Ruscio) and Mrs. Bink attend premarital counseling with Chandler, but Fred's mother (Carol Arthur) tries to stop to the wedding because she thinks Mrs. Bink is a gold-digger; two mentally-challenged people, Jimmy (Glen Poehlman) and Pat (Pam Rawuka), decide to get married after just one date and ask Chandler to perform the ceremony, but Jimmy's parents (Dick Van Patten and Patricia Van Patten) try to stop it. Note: This episode is dedicated to the memory of Graham Jarvis, who played Charles Jackson.
172	18	"Angel"	Peter Medak	Brenda Hampton	March 1, 2004	62006-08-172	5.46
The Camdens, especially Lucy and Ruthie, grow concerned that an unusually joyful Annie isn't dealing with her true emotions following her father's death, but the happiness spreads through the family and all over town. Meanwhile, Eric tries to convince an unhappy Chandler to consider adoption, which leads to a meeting with a lawyer (Randy Spelling), and later Chandler's approached by a mysterious young girl who gives him a cryptic message before disappearing.
173	19	"There's No Place Like It"	Joel J. Feigenbaum	Elaine Arata	April 19, 2004	62006-08-173	5.55
Prospective homeowners Lucy and Kevin learn that Chandler and his son-to-be Jeffrey (James Henrie) are their rivals in a bidding war over a house; Eric and Annie decide to use their savings to buy their house from the church; Ruthie is upset with Martin because she thinks he'll get the garage apartment instead of her when Lucy and Kevin move out; and Peter suspects that his dad Vic (Bryan Callen) is having an affair.
174	20	"High and Dry"	Harry Harris	Jeffrey Rodgers	April 26, 2004	62006-08-174	6.23
Lucy and Kevin celebrate their one-year wedding anniversary and contemplate whether they are ready to start a family, and Lucy refuses to drink champagne with Kevin during dinner. Cecilia and Martin realize that their relationship might suffer if Cecilia goes away to college. Chandler's foster son asks him to rid their house of all alcoholic beverages. Peter lies to Ruthie about his plans for the evening when she asks him to help her baby-sit the twins, then goes missing, and Eric and Vic find him drinking alcohol with friends at the park; when Peter calls to apologize, Ruthie tells him she loves him but she can't date him if he drinks. Also, a new couple in town calls on Eric and Annie for help...and decorating their house.
175	21	"Lost and Found"	Harvey Laidman	Paul Perlove	May 3, 2004	62006-08-175	6.07
Lucy finds Kevin and Roxanne in a compromising position while on an undercover police assignment; Cecilia and Martin's after-school commitments get in the way of one-on-one time, and Chandler feels overwhelmed as a new parent; Ruthie and Peter get lost during a school field trip and meet "Lost Boys" Nicodemus and Jacob, who not only take care of them until Eric arrive, but also share their heartbreaking story of struggling to stay alive during the civil war in Sudan.
176	22	"Little White Lies" (Part 1)	Joel J. Feigenbaum	Sue Tenney	May 10, 2004	62006-08-176	6.49
Matt, who is having problems in his marriage to Sarah (Sarah Danielle Madison), visits Glenoak and runs into his ex-girlfriend Heather on his flight home; Simon unexpectedly announces he's coming home for the summer; Lucy wants to know why Roxanne is suddenly too busy to hang out with her and suspects she's trying to become a detective behind Kevin's back; Ruthie keeps a secret about a fellow student from her parents; Martin learns that his baseball teammates think he's having sex with Cecilia.
177	23	"Little White Lies" (Part 2)	Joel J. Feigenbaum	Sue Tenney	May 17, 2004	62006-08-177	6.86
The Camden chaos continues with Matt, who is trying to salvage his marriage, questioning whether he still has feelings for his ex-girlfriend Heather (Andrea Ferrell). Meanwhile, Simon's return to Glenoak makes Cecilia feel torn between him and Martin; Ruthie's foreign-exchange student friend Maria (Samantha Sandoval) appears to be pursuing Peter; and grandparents-to-be Eric and Annie hop a plane to New York, despite Mary's repeated pleas for her family to stay away while she gives birth. Note: This is the final episode for Ashlee Simpson, Rachel Blanchard, and Jeremy London.
