= 7th Heaven season 7 =

7th Heaven
- Season 7
- DVD cover
- No. of episodes: 22

Release
- Original network: The WB
- Original release: September 16, 2002 – May 19, 2003

Season chronology
- ← Previous; Season 6 Next → Season 8

The seventh season of 7th Heaven—an American family-drama television series, created and produced by Brenda Hampton—premiered on September 16, 2002, on The WB, and concluded on May 19, 2003 (22 episodes).

== Cast and characters ==
=== Main ===
- Stephen Collins as Eric Camden
- Catherine Hicks as Annie Camden
- David Gallagher as Simon Camden
- Beverley Mitchell as Lucy Camden-Kinkirk
- Mackenzie Rosman as Ruthie Camden
- Nikolas and Lorenzo Brino as Sam and David Camden
- Adam LaVorgna as Robbie Palmer (8 episodes)
- Geoff Stults as Ben Kinkirk (12 episodes)
- George Stults as Kevin Kinkirk
- Ashlee Simpson as Cecilia Smith
- Rachel Blanchard as Roxanne Richardson
- Jeremy London as Chandler Hampton (episodes 7-9, 11–22)
- Happy as Happy the Dog

=== Recurring ===
- Jessica Biel as Mary Camden (5 episodes)
- Barry Watson as Matt Camden (3 episodes)
- Scotty Leavenworth as Peter Petrowski (10 episodes)

== Episodes ==
No. overall	No. in season	Title	Directed by	Written by	Original release date	Prod. code	Viewers (millions)
133	1	"Monkey Business (Part 1)"	Tony Mordente	Brenda Hampton	September 16, 2002	62006-07-133	9.16
Officer Kevin Kinkirk moves into the Camdens' garage apartment, intending to propose to Lucy in the semi-near future, but Lucy is impatient to be married and feels threatened by another woman in Kevin's life; Robbie fears that he's losing his place as the "big brother" of the family; Mary is reluctant to reveal her latest love interest; and preteen Ruthie brings home her very first boyfriend. Notes: This marked the first appearances of Ashlee Simpson as Cecilia Smith and Rachel Blanchard as Roxanne Richardson.
134	2	"Monkey Business Deux (Part 2)"	Joel J. Feigenbaum	Brenda Hampton	September 23, 2002	62006-07-134	7.90
Simon's paid-dating service is becoming profitable until Cecilia rats him out to Eric; the family learns of, and objects to, Mary's much-older man and she plans to run away with him; Kevin sets Ruthie straight on who's the adult and who's the child in the Camden household.
135	3	"The Enemy Within"	Harry Harris	Brenda Hampton	September 30, 2002	62006-07-135	8.47
Ken Smith (Pat Boone) visits Annie and Eric to accuse Mary of seducing his son Jack and to threaten to sell the land next to the church if Mary doesn't break up with him. Simon is punished by his parents. Simon finds out from Cecilia that a girl from his dating service is pregnant and convinces her (with Det. Michaels' help) to drop her baby off at a hospital. When Lucy catches Ben reading her journal, she wonders if Kevin has ever been with another woman. Ben sees a girl making fun of Ruthie when he picks her up from school, and when she makes fun of him the vice-principal (Cindy Williams) calls the police.
136	4	"Bowling for Eric"	Tony Mordente	Sue Tenney	October 7, 2002	62006-07-136	8.61
Eric receives frightening news from his doctor and calls a family meeting, then loses his nerve and proposes a family bowling night instead; the evening isn't quite successful because most of the kids are bickering amongst one another, and Annie worries about what Eric might be hiding from her.
137	5	"The Heart of The Matter"	Tony Mordente	Sue Tenney	October 14, 2002	62006-07-137	8.93
As Eric undergoes a double bypass, most of the family is there to support him, but Ruthie is home with the twins because she's angry with her father and refuses to visit him in the hospital; Lucy announces that she's ready to be engaged to Kevin, then fumes when he says he has no plans to propose; Simon is upset that the whole family isn't together during this crisis; when Matt's wife Sarah shows up, Annie has a difficult request. As all this goes on, Eric experiences strange hallucinations during his surgery.
138	6	"Regarding Eric"	Joel J. Feigenbaum	Sue Tenney	October 21, 2002	62006-07-138	8.45
Lucy's developmentally-challenged friend Paul (Gordon Billinger) asks her to convince his brother and sister-in-law to let him join "The Famous People Players," a traveling puppeteer troupe; stuck at home recovering from surgery, Eric yearns to get back to work despite the doctor's restrictions, so Annie asks the kids to go to him with their problems to make him feel needed; Ruthie takes this to heart and tells him how he should be helping everyone with their romantic entanglements, but his meddling leads to chaos; Kevin learns that Ben plans to extend his temporary stay in Glenoak.
139	7	"Gabrielle Come Blow Your Horn"	Tony Mordente	Brenda Hampton	November 4, 2002	62006-07-139	8.54
Eric is stunned to learn that the church has hired a new associate-pastor, Chandler Hampton, to help out while he recovers from his surgery; Lucy is furious when she and Ruthie spot Kevin and Roxanne at a jewelry store, thinking they're picking out her engagement ring together without her; Simon listens unenthusiastically as Cecilia tells him all about her new French boyfriend; "The Colonel" sends a loud, chain-smoking housekeeper (guest-star Phyllis Diller) to restore order to the Camden household.
140	8	"Peer Pressure"	Bradley Gross	Barry Watson	November 11, 2002	62006-07-140	7.80
Eric and Rabbi Glass (Richard Lewis) visit the church to spy on the new associate-pastor (Jeremy London); Ruthie is caught slow-dancing with her boyfriend when she's supposed to be babysitting Sam and David; Lucy asks Simon to dig up some information on Roxanne during his ride-along with her and Kevin in their patrol car; Kevin runs into his ex-wife (Mindy Burbano). Note This is the final appearance of Adam LaVorgna.
141	9	"Lost Souls"	Harry Harris	Brenda Hampton	November 18, 2002	62006-07-141	8.81
Eric's strange post-surgery behavior leads him to make a life-altering decision that shocks Annie: he considers another calling when the ministry begins to lose its appeal, a new neighbor calls him "Mr. Camden," and he gets fed up with everyone bringing their problems to him, so becomes more and more apathetic toward his family and community. Meanwhile, Lucy turns to the new associate-pastor for advice when she sees Kevin and Roxanne having too much fun dancing at the pool hall; Kevin interrupts Simon and Cecilia's date to enlist their help when he can't find Lucy.
142	10	"A Cry for Help"	Tony Mordente	Sue Tenney	November 25, 2002	62006-07-142	9.06
Amidst a career crisis, Eric takes a talk-DJ job at a college radio station, to Annie's dismay, but things quickly become serious during his very first shift with his producer (Usher) when a male student, Carl (Matt Czuchry) calls in threatening suicide; Lucy's refusal to spend time with Roxanne puts Kevin in an impossible situation, and Roxanne later asks her boss to assign her a new partner as tension simmers between her and Lucy; Ben is almost arrested when he accompanies Simon and Cecilia to an underage club; Ruthie tries to find a way to break up with her boyfriend (Oliver Adams) without making him cry.
143	11	"Sunday"	Joel J. Feigenbaum	Brenda Hampton	January 6, 2003	62006-07-143	6.85
Eric gives Annie his manuscript to read but she's not happy to learn that he's been spending his time writing "smut" instead of his comeback sermon; Simon and Cecilia discuss having sex for the first time and naïvely share the news with their parents, and Cecilia's father is furious; Lucy spies on Roxanne and Chandler's first date.
144	12	"Back in the Saddle"	Tony Mordente	Brenda Hampton	January 20, 2003	62006-07-144	7.54
Annie's at her wits' end, so Eric begrudgingly agrees to see a therapist--who offers him unsympathetic advice; Simon is ecstatic when Cecilia's father agrees to let him see her, but feels hurt and confused when she starts avoiding him. Roxanne becomes suspicious when a pretty girl seeks Chandler's counsel; Ruthie is shocked to learn that her upbeat new friend Katelyn (Rosman's stepsister Katelyn Salmont) has cystic fibrosis.
145	13	"It's Not Always About You"	Joel J. Feigenbaum	Lawrence H. Levy	January 27, 2003	62006-07-145	7.12
Though curious about Eric's therapy, Annie panics when his doctor invites her to one of their sessions; Kevin is upset when Lucy tries everything to get excused from jury duty and he learns that their views of the judicial system differ; when a homeless man stabs Roxanne on the job, Chandler confesses the extent of his feelings for her; Ruthie overhears her parents fight and fears they might divorce.
146	14	"Smoking"	Tony Mordente	Sue Tenney	February 3, 2003	62006-07-146	8.38
Chandler learns that his father is dying of lung cancer but pushes Eric away when he tries to help; Lucy accepts a date with Chandler's chain-smoking tattooed brother Sid (Jason London) to make Kevin jealous enough to propose to her; Annie is shocked to find a pack of cigarettes in Simon's room; Ruthie's friend Peter (Scotty Leavenworth) begs her to lie and not tell his mother that he smokes.
147	15	"I Love Lucy"	Joel J. Feigenbaum	Brenda Hampton	February 10, 2003	62006-07-147	9.27
By Valentine's Day, Lucy is so worn-out and depressed from waiting for Kevin to propose that she's reluctant to go on a seemingly-ordinary dinner date with him; Roxanne thinks that Chandler might be ready to propose to her, but she has her own reasons for being hesitant to accept.
148	16	"Stand Up"	Lynn Harris	Sue Tenney	February 17, 2003	62006-07-148	8.34
Lucy informs Eric that her heart will break if he doesn't perform her wedding ceremony, and he struggles with the decision to return to the church; Simon catches Cecilia's father's (Brad Maule) business manager stealing from petty cash; Roxanne's policeman father (John Bennet Perry) tries to bully Chandler into ending his relationship with her; Ruthie and Peter use Ben's training dog to try to find him a girlfriend but they lose the dog; Annie hijacks Lucy's wedding by making every decision herself and paying no attention to Lucy's wishes.
149	17	"High Anxiety"	Joel J. Feigenbaum	Sue Tenney	February 24, 2003	62006-07-149	8.24
Eric and Annie learn that the Hamiltons are facing a marital crisis, so they draw on their own problems to stop their friends from making the same mistakes; stressed Lucy considers quitting school and Kevin threatens to call off their wedding if she does; Simon and Cecilia have an unusual way of keeping their minds off sex; Ruthie tries to protect Ben from Mary by finding him a new girlfriend; feeling that the police department dismissed her father unfairly, Roxanne resigns from it herself.
150	18	"We Do"	Tony Mordente	Brenda Hampton	April 21, 2003	62006-07-150	8.28
Kevin and Lucy are finally ready to wed, but an unexpected thunderstorm might prevent long-distance relatives from attending; Lucy is determined not to let anything put a damper on her dream wedding, until she starts questioning whether she wants to go through with it; Eric and Annie feel the pangs of watching their little girl grow up; Eric adjusts to the idea of returning to work at his church; Mary isn't alone as she heads back to Glenoak for the big event; and en route to the ceremony, a fight breaks out: Ben and his mother vs. Roxanne and Chandler. Note: This is the final episode of Graham Jarvis as Charles Jackson.
151	19	"That Touch of Bink" (Part 1)	Joel J. Feigenbaum	Brenda Hampton	April 28, 2003	62006-07-151	6.47
Eric and Chandler enlist Mrs. Bink's (Eileen Brennan) help to raise money for the church's leaky roof but discover that she herself could use some help; Ruthie's boyfriend Peter suspects that his mother's boyfriend is hiding something; Lucy shares intimate details of her newlywed life with Roxanne during their girls' night out; the twins steal money from their parents, Kevin, Lucy, Simon, Ruthie, and the kitchen can. To be continued...
152	20	"Dick" (Part 2)	Joel J. Feigenbaum & Harry Harris	Brenda Hampton & Jeffrey Rodgers	May 5, 2003	62006-07-152	6.77
After Ruthie's boyfriend Peter grows more suspicious of his mother's (Shannon Kenny) new fiancé (William R. Moses), Reverend Camden steps in to counsel them and get to the root of their problems; Chandler provides premarital counseling to a couple (Mayim Bialik and Bradley White) who don't seem destined for the altar; Cecilia confides to Simon the reason she doesn't want her parents to renew their wedding vows; Roxanne tries to convince Chandler to return home to see his dying father.
153	21	"Life and Death" (Part 1)	Tony Mordente	Brenda Hampton, Chris Olsen & Jeff Olsen	May 12, 2003	62006-07-153	7.05
Eric flies to New York in a final attempt to help Chandler reconcile with his dying father; Matt and Sarah suspect that they're expecting; Mary has news for Eric; having problems with Kevin, Lucy invites a teenager Christine to stay with the Camdens temporarily, unaware that the girl is hiding something; Simon is crushed when Cecilia won't go to the prom with him, and Ruthie is acting irritable. Guest star: Orson Bean
154	22	"Life and Death" (Part 2)	Tony Mordente	Brenda Hampton, Chris Olsen & Jeff Olsen	May 19, 2003	62006-07-154	8.28
Eric resorts to tricks to reunite Chandler with his dying father; Elsewhere, Matt and Sarah have some exciting news and Mary shares a big secret with Lucy; another girl turns Simon down for prom; Ruthie is embarrassed that she's gotten her first period but the family wants to celebrate it publicly; Kevin notices something odd about the Camdens' new houseguest; an unexpected visitor delivers life-changing news to the whole family.
