= 7th Heaven season 5 =

7th Heaven
- Season 5
- DVD cover
- No. of episodes: 22

Release
- Original network: The WB
- Original release: October 2, 2000 – May 21, 2001

Season chronology
- ← Previous; Season 4 Next → Season 6

The fifth season of 7th Heaven—an American family-drama television series, created and produced by Brenda Hampton—premiered on October 2, 2000, on The WB, and concluded on May 21, 2001 (22 episodes).

== Cast and characters ==
=== Main ===
- Stephen Collins as Eric Camden
- Catherine Hicks as Annie Camden
- Barry Watson as Matt Camden
- Jessica Biel as Mary Camden (episodes 1–7, 10–12, 14-16, 18 and 21–22)
- David Gallagher as Simon Camden
- Beverley Mitchell as Lucy Camden
- Mackenzie Rosman as Ruthie Camden
- Chaz Lamar Shepherd as John Hamilton
- Adam LaVorgna as Robbie Palmer (episodes 9–22)
- Happy as Happy the Dog

== Episodes ==
| No. overall | No. in season | Title | Directed by | Written by | Original release date | Prod. code | Viewers (millions) |
|---|---|---|---|---|---|---|---|
| 89 | 1 | "Here We Go Again" | Burt Brinckerhoff | Brenda Hampton | October 2, 2000 | 6200605-089 | 6.93 |
Eric is distressed that Mary is postponing college in favor of soul-searching and the glory of minimum wage, and she buys a car; Annie decides to complete her teaching degree; Simon navigates the treacherous terrain of high school and Lucy looks forward to ruling the school as a senior and dating Andrew Nayloss, who hasn't returned from summer vacation yet; Matt considers the pre-med track at college and his on-and-off relationship with Heather might be off for good; and Ruthie dreads spending another year with despised teacher Ms. Riddle.
| 90 | 2 | "Help" | Tony Mordente | Sue Tenney | October 9, 2000 | 6200605-090 | 6.92 |
Mary, still intent on her independence, buries herself in unpaid bills after losing her pool-hall job; The Colonel (Peter Graves) makes an unexpected visit; Matt blames everyone but himself for his failing grade in organic chemistry; Lucy enlists Simon to help her with her Homecoming Queen campaign to help him gain popularity at school; Ruthie's prayers are answered when she's transferred out of her nemesis' class and into a prestigious private school.
| 91 | 3 | "Losers" | Harvey Laidman | Brenda Hampton | October 16, 2000 | 6200605-091 | 6.95 |
Eric and Annie enjoy separate Friday-night outings: Eric calls a bewildered Matt when he can't find anyone to hang out with him, and Annie confers with a professor (Jeff Yagher). Mary strays even further from her parents' image of her when she is tempted to drink and smoke one night after work and makes friends with married co-workers Frankie and Johnny (Chyler Leigh and Nathan West) with questionable morals while working the late shift; Matt blows Simon's chance at a big date with an older woman (Katie Stuart) when he forgets to pick him up after being distracted by another female; Lucy and a classmate taste the not-so-glamorous side of parenting when they take care of an egg.
| 92 | 4 | "Busted" | Tony Mordente | Brenda Hampton | October 23, 2000 | 6200605-092 | 8.10 |
Exasperation reaches an all-time high in the Camden household, as Eric and Annie helplessly watch Mary and her worrisome friends continue down the path of destruction and into the hands of the law. When Frankie expresses interest in signing up for college classes, Mary starts checking out Lucy's early application packets. Meanwhile, Simon has a hot date, and Lucy gets a weird proposition from a classmate. Lastly, Ruthie discovers the manipulative fun of keeping a diary.
| 93 | 5 | "Blind" | Burt Brinckerhoff | Sue Tenney | October 30, 2000 | 6200605-093 | 7.23 |
Tensions run high as a doubtful Julie (Deborah Raffin) lets Mary babysit Erica, only if she has no visitors. But when Frankie comes by and begs Mary to take care of baby Mercy, Mary can't resist helping her...or opening the bottle of beer she finds in the diaper bag; unfortunately, she gets caught with it. Meanwhile, Lucy volunteers to supervise Ruthie's sleepover and watch the twins; Simon seeks to change his image; Matt pursues a woman who wants nothing to do with him; and Eric and Annie clash with Mary's disreputable friends.
| 94 | 6 | "Broke" | Joel J. Feigenbaum | Brenda Hampton & Sue Tenney | November 6, 2000 | 6200605-094 | 9.12 |
Still unemployed with bills mounting, Mary continues her downward spiral to rock bottom as Eric and Annie fight about how to effectively deal with her numerous lies and immature behavior. Meanwhile, the fear of what might happen to Mary takes a toll on the kids, prompting them to break open the twins' piggybanks to help Mary pay her bills, but they're forced to make a riskier decision to stop the credit-card company from calling. Meanwhile, Mary continues to ignore her responsibilities.
| 95 | 7 | "Bye" | Paul Snider | Brenda Hampton & Sue Tenney | November 13, 2000 | 6200605-095 | 10.42 |
Eric and Annie desperately puzzle out how Mary managed to pay her credit-card bill and the kids team up to throw them off the scent. But the parents finally get to the heartbreaking realization that the must take drastic action to help misguided Mary and protect and preserve the family, so they hold an intervention to share their feelings of hurt and betrayal, and end by announcing that they're sending her to Buffalo to stay with The Colonel and Grandma Ruth.
| 96 | 8 | "Gossip" | Chip Chalmers | Sue Tenney | November 20, 2000 | 6200605-096 | 8.82 |
Mary's future may be resolved, but the rumor mill surrounding her situation runs rampant (and ugly). Simon is persuaded to use his sister's bad reputation to boost his 'cool' quotient at school; he attracts bad-girl twins Carol and Sue Murphy (Mary-Kate and Ashley Olsen) and gets into his own trouble. Meanwhile, congregational gossip irks Eric; Lucy wrestles with high-school hearsay; Ruth spreads phone tales to draw attention away from Mary; Matt's infatuated with a beautiful stranger; and Annie goes out with an old boyfriend.
| 97 | 9 | "Tunes" | Tony Mordente | Brenda Hampton | November 27, 2000 | 6200605-097 | 8.85 |
The Camdens disapprove of Simon's new friends, one of whom--Norton--insults Annie and Lucy with his chauvinistic remarks. Norton is a fan of violent rap and misogynistic lyrics influence his negative attitude toward women, and Eric and Annie confront Simon about his new interest in rap and his burgeoning bad attitude. Meanwhile, Heather reconnects with Matt, who's unsure of her intentions until he finally finds out that she's dating someone else
| 98 | 10 | "Surprise!" | Bradley Gross | Chris Olsen | December 18, 2000 | 6200605-098 | 8.02 |
Despite the family's disapproval and his own doubts, Eric invites Mary's ex-boyfriend Robbie Palmer (Adam LaVorgna) to stay with them after learning he's homeless. Matt also shows up unexpectedly after John kicks him out of their apartment because he needs quality time with his girlfriend Priscilla. When Mary calls home and hears Robbie's voice, she assumes he's dating Lucy; John proposes to Priscilla in front of Matt.
| 99 | 11 | "Home" | Harvey Laidman | Jeff Olsen | January 22, 2001 | 6200605-099 | 7.43 |
A month later, Robbie happily acts as a member of the household, which frazzles Annie: Robbie is Eric's latest project, Ruthie's new best friend, recipient of Simon's financial advice, and--according to Mary--Lucy's boyfriend. He even folds laundry (the wrong way!) and cooks. Frustrated and emotionally-strained, Annie feels redundant. Robbie has the same effect on Matt, who drops in on Heather and her new boyfriend.
| 100 | 12 | "One Hundred" | David J. Plenn | Sue Tenney | January 29, 2001 | 6200605-100 | 8.78 |
Annie plans a mysterious day of cleaning as Eric freaks out at the shocking news that Mary ran away from Buffalo, thinking she and Robbie are up to something devious. Quite the opposite: the family has planned a huge surprise birthday party for Eric, attended by all the people whose lives he's changed for the better in the past few years. Preparations are interrupted when Ruthie discovers Frankie and Johnny's baby Mercy on the doorstep, so Annie recruits Robbie to take charge while she investigates. Meanwhile, Lucy gets a shock when she spends the day with Mike's near-catatonic mother; and Matt and Simon try to figure out why they delivered Mrs. Bink to the hospital.
| 101 | 13 | "Kiss" | Tony Mordente | Brenda Hampton & Sue Tenney | February 5, 2001 | 6200605-101 | 7.23 |
After their lackluster attempt at kissing, Mike and Lucy agree to be friends and fix each other up on dates—but the plan bothers Lucy more than she anticipated. Meanwhile, Matt is in a huff over John (Chaz Lamar Shepherd) and Robbie's new-found friendship and feels slighted by the family. Eric also continues to feel alienated from his family when they keep going to Annie for advice, and Annie feels slighted by Ruthie's unfunny joke with the twins.
| 102 | 14 | "V-Day" | Burt Brinckerhoff | Carol Tenney | February 12, 2001 | 6200605-102 | 6.35 |
Everyone strives to discover the identity of Robbie's secret Valentine's Day date; on her first date with Jeremy, Lucy is embarrassed when they keep running into her ex-boyfriends.
| 103 | 15 | "Sweeps" | Joel J. Feigenbaum | Brenda Hampton | February 19, 2001 | 6200605-103 | 7.95 |
Mary flies home to see Robbie and ask him to move to Buffalo; although he's as nervous as everyone else, his presence in the house during Mary's weekend stay causes much concern in the family. Matt and Lucy are especially suspicious when Lucy finds a condom in a misplaced wallet but they're even more shocked to discover that it belongs to Simon, who's spending the evening with new girlfriend Sasha.
| 104 | 16 | "Parents" | Tony Mordente | Sue Tenney | February 26, 2001 | 6200605-104 | 7.95 |
The deadbeat dad (Alan Thicke) who abandoned Robbie wants him back into his life; Annie feels inadequate when Lucy spends time with her friend's youthful, attractive mom.
| 105 | 17 | "Crazy" | Joel J. Feigenbaum | Teleplay by : Chris Olsen & Jeff Olsen; Story by : Brenda Hampton | April 16, 2001 | 6200605-105 | 6.57 |
An unlikely therapist helps Matt overcome his fears of becoming a doctor; Ruthie has a secret reason for skipping homeroom; Annie gets in the middle when Simon tries to break up with his girlfriend.
| 106 | 18 | "Apologize" | Harry Harris | Teleplay by : Chris Olsen & Jeff Olsen; Story by : Brenda Hampton | April 23, 2001 | 6200605-106 | 6.54 |
Robbie sparks jealousy when he meets a girl who looks just like Mary; Mary goes out to dinner with her old boyfriend Wilson; Robbie's ex Cheryl accepts a date with Matt.
| 107 | 19 | "Virgin" | Chip Chalmers | Brenda Hampton | April 30, 2001 | 6200605-107 | 6.13 |
Annie discovers that Eric is counseling Serena, a particularly-flirtatious mother of one of Lucy's friends, and strongly requests him to refer her to somebody else, then feels guilty that she interfered out of jealousy. Meanwhile, Simon is mortified when word gets around school that he's a virgin after Annie shared this detail with his ex-girlfriend Sasha's mother Rita; and Matt struggles with telling Robbie he's interested in Cheryl, and Robbie is keeping something about Heather from Matt.
| 108 | 20 | "Regrets" | Tony Mordente | Barbara Calloway & Brenda Hampton | May 7, 2001 | 6200605-108 | 6.97 |
Annie is devastated to find out that her father had a daughter out of wedlock, but she eventually accepts her new half-sister.
| 109 | 21 | "Chances... (Part 1)" | Burt Brinckerhoff | Sue Tenney | May 14, 2001 | 6200605-109 | 7.27 |
Feeling rejected by Robbie, Mary makes a shocking announcement that causes havoc in the family; Lucy and Jeremy announce their engagement; Matt reveals that he has been dating Cheryl.
| 110 | 22 | "...Are (Part 2)" | Burt Brinckerhoff | Sue Tenney | May 21, 2001 | 6200605-110 | 8.09 |
Lucy and Jeremy are delighted when Annie and Eric offer to support their long-term engagement; Robbie and Mary agree to be friends, but an ultimatum from Wilson leaves Mary having to make a life-changing decision.
