= List of 7th Heaven characters =

This is a list of characters from The WB/The CW (1996–2007) family drama, 7th Heaven.

Camden Family original cast

== Overview ==
= Main cast (credited)
= Recurring cast (3+)
= Guest cast (1-2)

Character	Actor	Seasons										
Character	Actor	1	2	3	4	5	6	7	8	9	10	11
Eric Camden	Stephen Collins	Main	Main	Main	Main	Main	Main	Main	Main	Main	Main	Main
Annie Camden	Catherine Hicks	Main	Main	Main	Main	Main	Main	Main	Main	Main	Main	Main
Matt Camden	Barry Watson	Main	Main	Main	Main	Main	Main	Recurring	Recurring	Main	Special Guest	
Simon Camden	David Gallagher	Main	Main	Main	Main	Main	Main	Main	Recurring	Main	Main	
Mary Camden	Jessica Biel	Main	Main	Main	Main	Main	Main	Recurring	Special Guest		Special Guest	
Lucy Camden	Beverley Mitchell	Main	Main	Main	Main	Main	Main	Main	Main	Main	Main	Main
Ruthie Camden	Mackenzie Rosman	Main	Main	Main	Main	Main	Main	Main	Main	Main	Main	Main
Happy the Dog	Happy	Main	Main	Main	Main	Main	Main	Main	Main	Main	Main	Main
John Hamilton	Chaz Lamar Shepherd	Recurring	Recurring	Recurring	Main	Main						
Shana Sullivan	Maureen Flannigan			Recurring	Main		Guest					
Robbie Palmer	Adam LaVorgna				Recurring	Main	Main	Main				
Sam and David Camden	Nikolas and Lorenzo Brino			Uncredited/featured	Uncredited/featured	Uncredited/featured	Main	Main	Main	Main	Main	Main
Ben Kinkirk	Geoff Stults						Recurring	Main		Recurring		Recurring
Kevin Kinkirk	George Stults						Recurring	Main	Main	Main	Main	Main
Roxanne Richardson	Rachel Blanchard							Main	Main			
Cecilia Smith	Ashlee Simpson							Main	Main			
Chandler Hampton	Jeremy London							Main	Main			
Martin Brewer	Tyler Hoechlin								Main	Main	Main	Main
Peter Petrowski	Scotty Leavenworth							Recurring	Main	Guest	Guest	
Rose Taylor	Sarah Thompson									Recurring	Main	
Meredith Davies	Megan Henning									Recurring	Main	
Sandy Jameson	Haylie Duff										Main	Main

== The Camden family ==
The Camden Family is made up of Eric and Annie and their seven children: Matt, Mary, Lucy, Simon, Ruthie, Sam, and David.

=== Eric Camden ===
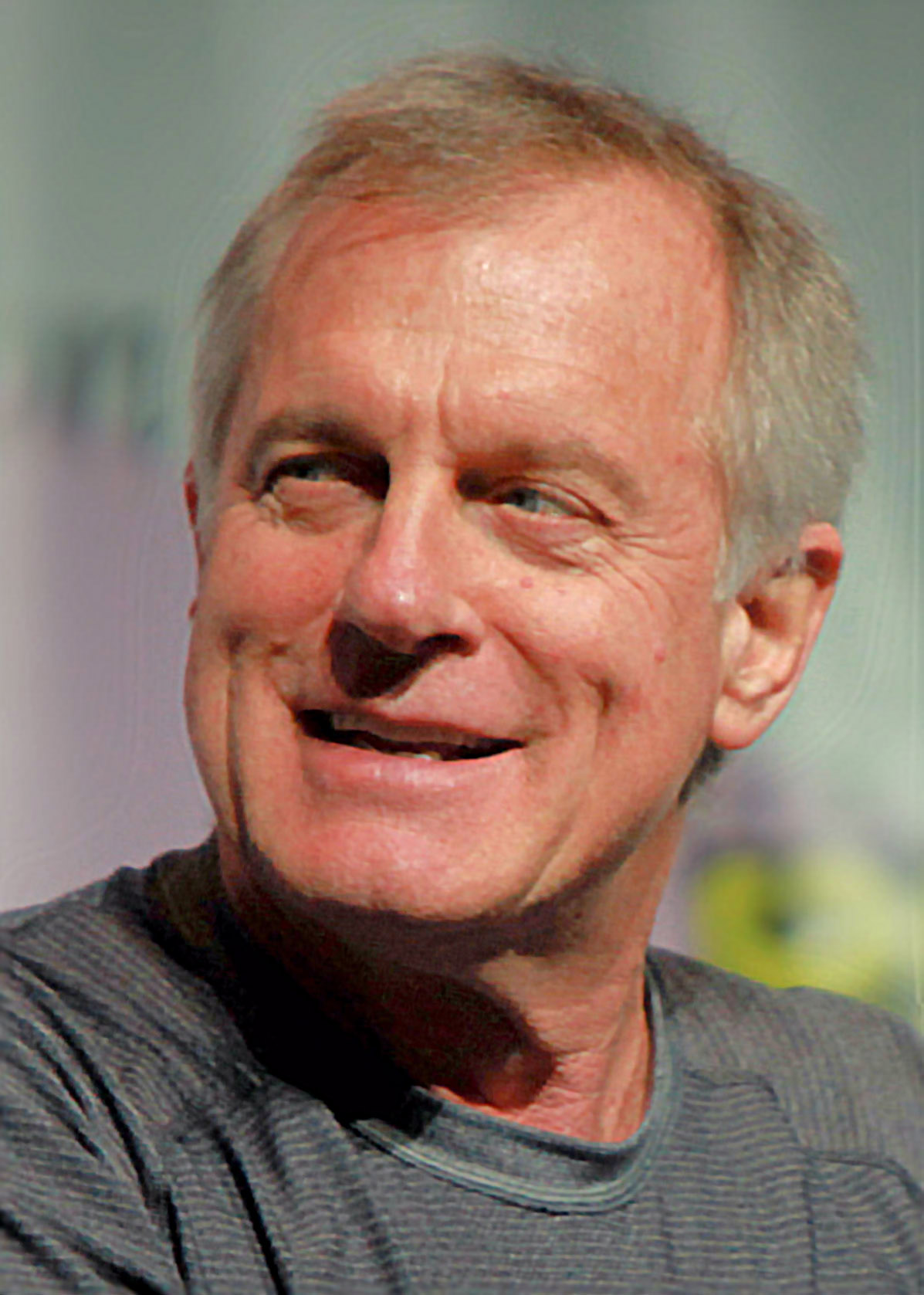
Stephen Collins as Rev. Eric Camden

Rev. Eric Camden (played by Stephen Collins) was raised in Binghamton, New York by his parents, Colonel John Camden and Ruth Lynch. Based on the episode "Halloween" (season 1), it appears that Eric was born in 1954 (which would make him 42 years old at the time). According to the episode "One Hundred" (season 5), his birthday is in January. Eric attended college for five years and graduated from Cobell Seminary. Shortly thereafter, he married and began a family with Annie Jackson. He has one sister, Julie Camden-Hastings, who ends up marrying the doctor that delivered Eric and Annie's oldest (Matt), as well as the youngest (Sam and David) children. After his heart-bypass operation, Eric decides to leave the ministry and even stop attending church. He renews his faith and returns to church in time to marry Kevin and Lucy (near the end of season 7). He had three cardiac episodes in seasons 4, 7 and 11 and survived.

=== Annie Camden ===
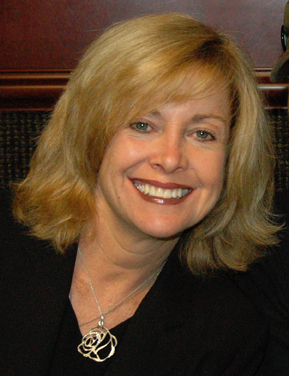
Catherine Hicks as Annie Camden

Anne "Annie" Camden (née Jackson) (played by Catherine Hicks) is the wife of Eric and mother of Matt, Mary, Lucy, Simon, Ruthie, Sam, and David. She has a half-sister named Lily, through her father, Charles Jackson. Her mother is Jenny Jackson. During her college education, Annie studied everything from art to business and economics, and in later seasons returned to school to earn a degree in early childhood education.

Though she has chosen to be a stay-at-home mother, Annie is a jack of all trades. She balances a family of nine on a minister's salary, is a plumber, builder, seamstress, cook, and much more. She also serves, from time to time, as the treasurer for the church.

Annie is the backbone of her family. The mother of seven, she is often the one who the children come to talk to, often over milk and cookies. She tries, with her husband, to instill strong morals in her children. She is noted as hoping Ruthie will not follow in her footsteps or of her two other daughters and marry too young. She hopes Ruthie will take the time to travel first.

Annie is the only daughter of her parents. Her mother, Jenny, dies early in the first season from cancer, a death that strikes Annie hard. Harder yet is her father's quick bounce to a relationship with Ginger. During one episode, Annie leaves the church after her father brings Ginger to service. Mary chases her and is struck by a car. Annie accepts Ginger slowly and Ginger and her father wed. Her father has Alzheimer's disease and Annie spends more and more time with him in Arizona before he dies. Annie is quoted in later seasons as saying that she likes Ginger a lot more now that her parents are back together. In an early season, Annie learned of an illegitimate daughter her father had with his high school girlfriend. She eventually meets this half-sister, Lily, and the two form a relationship over time.

In 2009, she was included in Yahoo!'s Top 10 TV Moms from Six Decades of Television for the decade 1996–2007.

=== Matt Camden ===
Matthew "Matt" Camden (played by Barry Watson) is Eric and Annie's firstborn. In the beginning of the series, Matt is a junior in high school and he was born in 1980. In the first season, he started out 16 years old. Matt sacrifices his school time to help others; if they wished to remain anonymous, he would respect that and not even tell his father. During high school, he bounces from job to job, including tutor and Dairy Shack delivery driver. He is not always a star student, but he manages to graduate at the top of his class and get accepted for a White House internship in Washington, D.C., with First Lady Hillary Clinton. He returns to Glenoak for college, rooming with friend and fellow "P.K." John Hamilton. Matt's new uncle, Dr. Hank Hastings (who had actually delivered him), helps him get a job in the hospital cafeteria; during his time there, he decides to become a doctor. His uncle Hank is the main inspiration why he wanted to become a doctor. He ends up working at the local free clinic with Hank, beginning by helping save the life of a woman who could not get anyone but Matt to take her symptoms of an ectopic pregnancy seriously.

He meets Sarah Glass (played by Sarah Danielle Madison), a fellow medical student, just when he really wished to meet the one who would be the love of his life. Their first date ends with them getting married. Because Sarah is the daughter of a rabbi (played by Richard Lewis) who wants his daughter to marry a Jewish man, they initially keep their marriage a secret. They eventually have a large family wedding presided over jointly by their proud fathers, who almost called off the wedding feuding over Matt, who plans to convert to Judaism. Matt and Sarah move to New York to attend medical school, and while there have been problems, they have remained happy together. Near the series' end, they graduate from medical school and announce that they are expecting twin boys, who are born the following summer in 2006. It is also shown throughout the series that he knows American Sign Language, a result of his relationship with Heather, making him bilingual.

=== Simon Camden ===
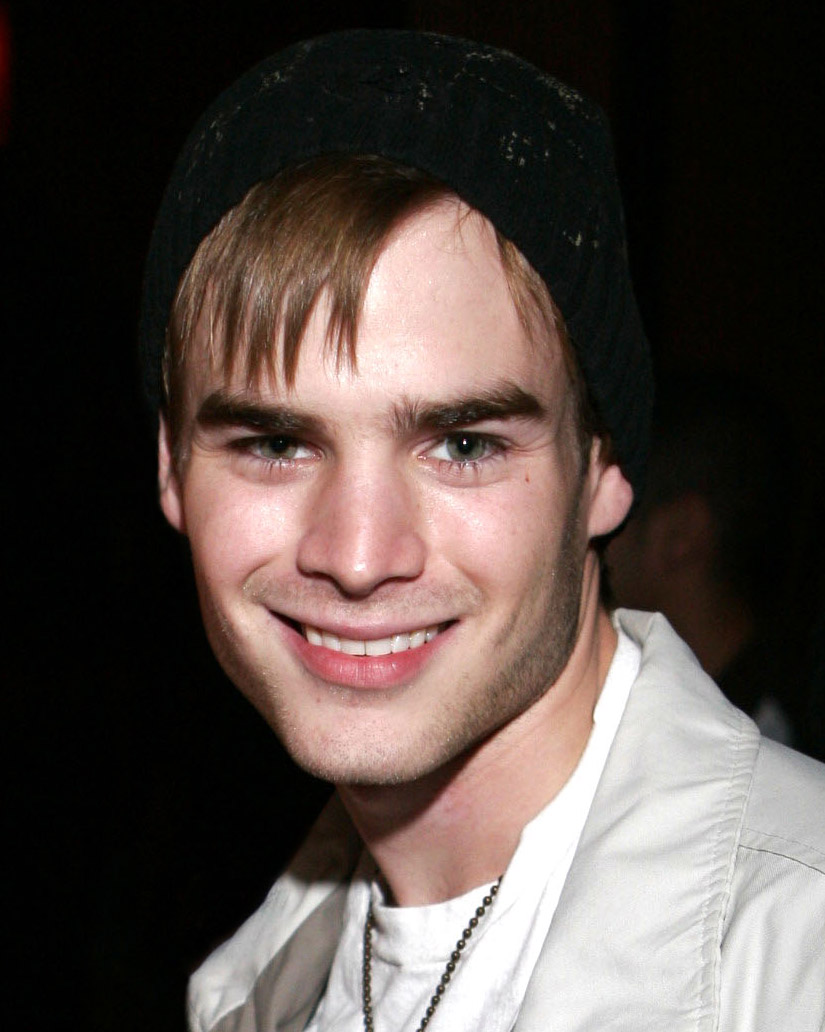
David Gallagher as Simon Camden

Simon Camden (David Gallagher) is the 4th born and 2nd son. In the early part of the series, he is known to his siblings as "The Bank of Simon" because he always seems to have money, and he loves to make money. His other interests have included golf, magic, and cars. He was born in 1986 and in the first year he started out when he was 10 years old.

During the pilot episode, Simon's most fervent wish is for a dog. When asked to say grace before the family had dinner, he even includes a dog request in his prayer. Although his parents do not think he is mature enough for the responsibility of a pet, Annie goes to the pound "just to look" and falls in love with a dog who was scheduled to be euthanized. This dog became the Camdens' beloved "Happy."

Simon meets a girl named Deena in sixth grade and finds out that Eric counseled her family years ago when she was diagnosed with leukemia. They date for the majority of middle school, but break up on the last day of eighth grade, though they remain friends.

Transitioning to high school is rough for Simon, despite help from his bubbly, popular big sister Lucy. He dates a girl named Cecilia Smith (Ashlee Simpson), and they even consider furthering their relationship by becoming sexually involved with one another, but decide against it. The summer before his senior year, Simon accidentally hits and kills a boy named Paul Smith who was Ruthie's age. Since Paul was on a bicycle with no helmet and was later proven to be under the influence of drugs, the death is ruled accidental and Simon is not brought up on criminal charges, but he cannot stop blaming himself for the accident and also fears retaliation from Paul's older brother, who was the likely guilty party who spray-painted "thou shall not kill" on the sign at Reverend Camden's church. He passes the CHSPE and leaves school early to start college. While in college, partly as a way to cope with his guilty feelings and low self-esteem, he breaks the family's edict of not having premarital sex.

Simon has three serious girlfriends over the course of the show: Deena, Cecilia, and Rose. He later gets involved with a girl that he knew from college, Sandy, who has a son named Aaron, fathered by Martin Brewer. Simon provides emotional, and maybe even physical support for Sandy and her son.

After a scare involving Simon's girlfriend Georgia being pregnant (it is later revealed that she only made the claim so Simon would stay with her), he meets Rose. Simon and Rose fall deeply in love, get engaged, and plan a wedding, but when the wedding day finally comes, they decide to not get married because neither is ready for marriage and Rose still has feelings for an ex-boyfriend. Sandy and her son Aaron come to the party after the non-wedding and Sandy says she needs to talk to him; her message isn't revealed, but the assumption is that it's about Aaron's paternity and that Simon is Aaron's father. In season 11, it is confirmed that he is not the father. Simon eventually goes on to marry someone else or at least get engaged (as Ruthie hints in season 11), and he graduates from college.

=== Mary Camden ===
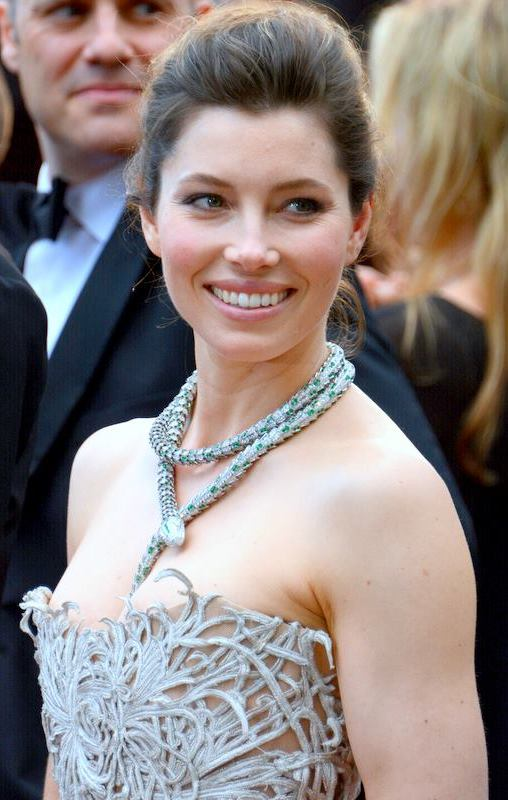
Jessica Biel, who played Mary Camden

Mary Camden-Rivera (played by Jessica Biel) is the second-born child and the eldest daughter of Eric and Annie. She was born in 1982 and started out when she was 14 years old. Mary might be considered the black sheep of the Camden family. By the time she is 15, Mary is an aspiring athlete with an immense love for basketball. As the months progress, she seems to rise in both ability and confidence (so much so that she wants to play in the WNBA someday) until she is hit by a car before the end of her freshman year, critically injuring her knee. She has a series of different boyfriends. She dates Wilson West, a guy she meets at the park while with Ruthie, who becomes her first love. He later reveals to Mary that he had sex with a 16-year-old girl and got her pregnant. The girl died in childbirth, leaving Wilson with their son Wilson Jr., called Billy. By Mary's senior year, she and her basketball teammates allow their grades to slip, which causes their coach to impose a lockout on them. After a secret meeting, the team decides to enact their frustrations by vandalizing the school gym. They are caught at the scene of the crime, and are arrested. Through a special program for first offenders, Mary is able to evade serious punishment by doing community service, which is where she meets Robbie Palmer. When she gets her driver's license, she can not parallel park but, on Lucy's advice, cries about it and the driving instructor compassionately gives her a passing grade. Mary has a dream of playing pro for the Lakers, and thinks that when her coach rings her up that this is the dream coming true, but it's actually training disabled people for the Special Olympics.

Mary decides not to go to college since she lost her scholarship, but work instead. She cannot hold down a job, being fired everywhere, from The Pool Hall to Pete's Pizza. While working at Pete's, she meets Frankie and Johnny, a young, drug-addicted married couple who have a baby girl named Mercy. Eric and Annie learn that Mary has been caught drinking while babysitting her cousin, Erica, pulled over by a cop, and given a warning, and that she has numerous debts to credit card companies, insurance companies, and to her family. Not wanting Mary to hit rock bottom, Eric and Annie decide it is best that she go to Buffalo because they can not give her the attention she needs. She lives with her grandparents, works at a homeless shelter in the fall, and starts college in the winter. Her departure causes some people in the church community to think that Mary had an unplanned pregnancy, but Eric quickly refutes the rumor. She leaves home angry at her entire family, whom she sees as betraying her, and refuses to speak to her father. In time, she calms down and plans to return home for the summer, as she and Robbie start dating again.

While in New York, she discovers that Wilson is also living there. Instead of staying in Glenoak for the summer like she originally planned, she breaks up with Robbie and moves back to New York and starts dating Wilson. After getting advice from the Colonel, she decides to get a job in public service. When she cannot become a police officer because she is not old enough, she applies for a position as a firefighter, and, after the Colonel pulls some strings, she gets into the firefighter program. When she starts training, she meets Ben Kinkirk, who is also in training. He comes over to her place and they kiss, which Wilson walks in on. The two break up and she returns home to California for a time, but on a trip to New York with Lucy, she reveals that she is moving back to New York to train to be a flight attendant. She begins dating a pilot, Jack, who is the same age as her father, though this does not last. She moves to Florida for a time to get away from her family. While in Florida, Mary runs into Carlos Rivera, a man she had met while volunteering at a homeless shelter years earlier, and who the Camdens took in during the holiday season. Carlos and Mary get married shortly after Lucy, and they reveal her pregnancy and the marriage to her family at that time. Her parents visit at the birth of her son, Charles Miguel "Charlie", named in honor of her and Carlos' late grandfathers. They eventually divorce and Carlos takes Charlie back to Puerto Rico when Mary gives her parental rights up. It is announced by Carlos when he attends Simon's wedding that the two are back together and that Mary is expecting twin girls. Though Mary is not at Simon's wedding, she is able to still see her family the next day, as she finally graduates from college the same day as Matt and Sarah. During the following summer, Mary gives birth to twin daughters. Mary's son is born in 2004 and her twin daughters born in 2006.

=== Lucy Camden ===
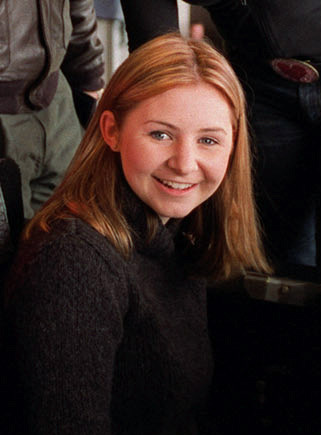
Beverley Mitchell as Lucy Camden

Lucy Camden-Kinkirk (played by Beverley Mitchell) is the third Camden child, born 1984, and middle daughter. In earlier seasons, Lucy is known for the many boyfriends she has, as well as being overly dramatic. Until season 4, she is often seen as "less than" her sister Mary and her emotions often get her into trouble. By the time she reaches her junior year in high school, however, Lucy becomes much more settled and switches positions with Mary, serving as an example of model teen behavior. Her first boyfriend is Jimmy Moon. She has one "normal" relationship with him, but they break up. In the beginning of season two, she is crying all summer and says that Jimmy is dating Ashley. At one point, she gets arrested for being in the area where Jimmy is dealing drugs. Later, Jimmy is shown when he had some problems with drugs, and the last time is when Lucy had a case as juror (though nobody told her what it was about; because she knew the defendant personally, she was dismissed). In school, she has many friends and is popular—including being nominated for homecoming queen in her senior year. She has a very good relationship with her friend Mike, who is placed in a mental hospital and is otherwise ostracized. Although Mike likes Lucy, it never quite works out. Later Lucy becomes engaged to Mike's friend, Jeremy, but they eventually break it off.

In season seven, she marries Kevin Kinkirk and has a daughter named Savannah (season 9). Savannah is born in 2005. They live in the apartment above the garage at the Camdens' house up until Savannah is a few months old. She also becomes pregnant with twin boys, whom she loses in a miscarriage that deeply upsets her emotional state—though she eventually recovers. At the end of the summer, she tells Kevin that she does not want to have any more children. She is a working mother (working as an associate pastor), while her husband Kevin is a stay-at-home dad. However, Kevin is offered a job as a police sheriff in "Crossroads". Later on, Lucy helps a young woman named Sandy with her pregnancy, and they soon become friends. Helping Sandy drives her to reconsider the fact that she does not want more children. In the series finale, she and Kevin announce to the family they are expecting twin boys again. Lucy continues her life as daughter, wife, mother and church minister.

=== Ruthie Camden ===
Ruth "Ruthie" Camden (played by Mackenzie Rosman) is the fifth child and youngest daughter. She is named in honor of her paternal grandmother.

During her youth, she is portrayed as the rather precocious family sneak who loves horses. Ruthie was born in 1991, and she was about 5 years old in the first season. She began pre-Kindergarten during the first season and ended the series graduating high school two years early at age 16. One of her teachers tries to call her "Ruth" as she assumes it is her given name, but Ruthie says her given name is "Ruthie". In later seasons, she tells Robbie she has never had a nickname. She and Simon have much fun together as children, and become very close as they move toward maturity.

Ruthie is the only Camden child to briefly attend a private school, but she leaves in protest that her friend Yasmine is being denied admission because she is a Muslim. During her freshman year she begins to wear makeup and develops feelings for Camden houseguest Martin Brewer and even tells him she loves him—but quickly covers by adding "as a brother." Ruthie considers Martin her first true love. In her sophomore year of high school she begins to date older boys in the hope that this would lead to a relationship with Martin. In season ten's "Love and Obsession", she dreams everything from Martin telling her that a paternity test had proved that Simon, not Martin, is Aaron's father, to there being no Aaron at all because Martin had never met Sandy. When her former childhood boyfriend Peter returns during this time, she realizes that she had moved on from him. After ignoring Sandy for most of her pregnancy, Martin is present for Aaron's birth, as are both of Aaron's grandfathers-to-be. Upon Aaron's birth Martin leaves Glenoak for college, he now lives near his son. This leaves Ruthie heartbroken, but by the time Martin finally admits to her that he loves her, she is in love with new Camden houseguest T-Bone. Ruthie and T-Bone love each other very much and even get tattoos, with Ruthie getting a tattoo of T-Bone's name, and T-Bone getting Ruthie's initials. After an argument they break up. Ruthie starts seeing Martin briefly. Martin says he wants to work things out with her but Ruthie chooses T-Bone and then Ruthie and T-Bone get back together. Ruthie decides to graduate from high school early and that she and T-Bone want to travel the world together. After her graduation, Ruthie with T-Bone join the whole family, and the other current Camden house guests, for an RV road trip that includes a stop at Simon's college graduation and that after that Ruthie and T-Bone plan to go travel the world together.

=== Sam and David Camden ===
Samuel "Sam" and David Camden are fraternal twin boys and the youngest of the Camden children. They were originally played by all four Brino quadruplets: Lorenzo, Myrinda, Nikolas, and Zachary, but once the quads started aging and showing differences between them, Lorenzo and Nikolas became the official actors for Sam and David.

Sam and David are born during episode fourteen of season three ("In Praise of Women"). This episode was The WB's most watched hour. They were partly named after the R&B duo Sam and Dave. They were born in 1999 in the third season.

=== Happy ===
Happy the Dog debuts in the pilot episode, "Anything You Want", in which Simon begs his parents for a dog, and also prays to God about it. One day, he is up in his attic and he hears a faint bark. He then looks out the window and a dog is sitting in the front yard. Later (in the two-part season two finale), the daughter of Happy's previous owners sees their dog (they called her Whitey) on TV and wants her back. The father comes to the Camdens threatening legal action if "Happy"/"Whitey" is not returned. Simon and Ruthie try to dye Happy's fur with food coloring in an attempt to make her look like a different dog. At the end (of part two), Happy runs away to return to the Camdens, and Whitey's family agrees that after two years with the Camdens, this beloved pet belonged with them and would not be "happy" anywhere else.

== Extended family ==
=== The Glass Family ===
Dr. Sarah Glass-Camden (portrayed by Sarah Danielle Madison) is the only child of Richard and Rosina Glass and the wife of Matt Camden. She first appears in the season six episode "I Really Do" as one of Matt's co-workers in the free women's clinic where both Matt and Hank work. Matt has a blind date, but he is called in to go to work instead at the last minute, and ends up talking to Sarah all night. Sarah asks Matt out for coffee and they grow quite close. She is an only child with a Rabbi for a father. Sarah reveals that she is independently wealthy, along with many other "intimate" details. The next night, they go out for dinner after introducing each other to their parents. They marry that night, but when they try to tell her parents, they end up only admitting they "got engaged". Ruthie is the only person to find out about the marriage (and keeps it a secret until the season ten episode "Secrets"). The Camden family always knew Matt was married and eloped but they never say anything. The Camdens have dinner at the Glass house, in an attempt by Matt and Sarah to bring the families closer. After both fathers do all they can to stop it, Matt and Sarah marry for the second time.

Matt and Sarah attend medical school at Columbia University in New York City, returning to Glenoak when they can, sometimes together, sometimes separately. Their marriage hits some shaky patches, especially as Matt keeps encountering his ex-girlfriend Heather. At first, Matt and Sarah do not reveal to anyone at the hospital that they are married, and Sarah decides that even married, she will be known professionally as Dr. Glass. In the season ten finale, the Glass-Camdens graduate and announce that they are expecting twin boys in the summer. Their twin boys were born in 2006.

Rabbi Richard Glass (Richard Lewis) is Sarah's father. He did not approve of Matt at first because he is not Jewish. When the Camdens have dinner at his home, he tries to make them feel comfortable by joking around with them. At the same time, he is very serious about Judaism and the laws surrounding it. Despite his and Eric's religious differences, they have become good friends following their children's marriage and started to accept Matt.

Rosina Glass (Laraine Newman) is Sarah's mother. Unlike her husband Rosina liked Matt and helped Sarah plan her wedding to Matt. She is more easy going and relaxed than her husband like Annie.

=== The Riveras ===
Carlos Rivera (Carlos Ponce) becomes Mary's husband in season eight after a guest appearance five seasons earlier in the episode "Here Comes Santa Claus". (While Jessica Biel was absent from the show, her character of Mary continues with the help of Carlos.) Mary and Carlos even have a son, Charles "Charlie" Miguel. Although Mary files for divorce from Carlos and even signs away custody of her son (in the two-part season nine finale), by the season ten finale they are back together and expecting twin girls, and Mary is graduating college. In the beginning of season 11, it is mentioned that Mary gave birth to her twins over the summer and is teaching at a high school and coaching a girls high school basketball team in New York, where she and Carlos live with their three children.

Charles Miguel "Charlie" Rivera is Mary and Carlos's baby boy named after Carlos' and Mary's grandfathers who have died.

=== The Kinkirks ===
Kevin Kinkirk (George Stults) is first introduced as a police officer in a New York airport, and soon revealed to be Ben's older brother. Kevin and Lucy set up a date as soon as they met, and like each other so much they decide to pursue a long-distance relationship. Kevin eventually transfers to the Glenoak police force, and moves in with the Camdens. Around season seven, he took over Matt's role as the big brother of the Camden family. He reveals to Lucy that he was once married before, when he and an ex-girlfriend had a pregnancy scare. They got married, but did not have a child so decided to divorce and still remain good friends. Kevin and Lucy eventually get engaged and marry each other, living together in the apartment over the garage and then moving into the house directly behind the Camdens at the end of season nine. Kevin has a daughter with Lucy named Savannah. While on duty, Kevin is almost shot and later decides to be a stay-at-home dad. He convinces Lucy to adopt a Great Dane named Sampson, but Lucy also makes the decision to adopt a tiny Yorkshire terrier named Delilah. It is revealed that Kevin and Lucy were expecting twin boys; however, Lucy has a miscarriage over the summer. In the series finale, Lucy tells him that she is pregnant again.

Savannah Kinkirk (Alyssa and Hannah Yadrick) (born in season nine episode "Paper or Plastic?") is Kevin and Lucy's oldest child. Her name is derived from Savannah, Georgia, the place where Kevin and Lucy went on their honeymoon. Savannah was born in an elevator with Matt helping with the delivery.

Ben Kinkirk (Geoff Stults) is Kevin's younger brother. They are two years apart. He is introduced as Mary's fellow firefighter trainee in Buffalo (in the season six episode "Relationships"). Ben becomes interested in Mary while she is pondering Wilson's marriage proposal. Ben attends Kevin and Lucy's wedding in the episode, "We Do." The last time he appears is in season 11's "Pain in the Neck," where he attempts to flirt with Ms. Margo, the teacher who made a move on Eric.

Patty-Mary Kinkirk (Natalie Ramsey) is Ben and Kevin's younger sister. She first appears in season six's "Letting Go." She is introduced as a student in San Francisco.

=== The Jacksons ===
Jenny Jackson (Alice Hirson) is Annie's mother. She is introduced in the pilot episode, "Anything You Want," when she came to Glenoak to tell Annie that she had leukemia. In the episode, In the Blink of an Eye, after spending her final days living life to its fullest, (i.e. shopping for the family, drinking wine, flying first class, not watching her cholesterol) she dies in her sleep while staying with the Camdens. She tells Annie goodbye and disappears in her room. Her post-funeral and memorial occurred in No Funerals and a Wedding. While Annie is asleep before she gives birth to the twins, Jenny appears to her in a dream, encouraging and reassuring her (in season three, episode 14 "In Praise of Women"). Her final appearance was made in the season eleven episode "Christmas", where she tries to help Eric after he is suddenly transported to heaven. She shows Eric a pin that was given to her by Charles after Annie was born, and Annie ends up finding it in Eric's hand when he comes home.

Charles Jackson (Graham Jarvis) is Annie's father, who is introduced in the pilot episode, "Anything You Want." In the episode, "In the Blink of an Eye," he almost tells Simon that his moon rocks are not real, and then receives them later and declares that he is lucky to have them. He has another daughter named Lily, whom he fathered from a previous relationship before he met Jenny. He quickly takes off after Jenny's funeral, in "No Funerals and a Wedding," because he does not want to fall apart. He ends up turning back from the airport and sits at the cemetery for a few hours before finally returning to the Camdens' house to apologize to Annie. He later appears in "Dangerous Liaisons, Part 1" where he introduces his new girlfriend, Ginger, to the Camdens. This angers Annie, but the problem is solved (in "Dangerous Liaisons, Part 2"). He later marries Ginger, and is diagnosed with Alzheimer's disease shortly afterwards. When Lily is getting married, Charles plans on walking her down the aisle, much to the dismay of Annie, but ends up having a heart attack and dying.

Ginger Jackson (Beverly Garland) is Charles Jackson's second wife, whom he meets three months after Jenny's death. She first appears in "Dangerous Liaisons, Part 1" where she is introduced to the Camden family as his girlfriend. However, Annie quickly develops a hatred of her, and refuses to accept the relationship, with Ginger's sons and grandchildren feeling the same about Charles. She makes peace with Annie in "Dangerous Liaisons, Part 2." She marries Charles in the season three episode "And the Home of the Brave", where they both acknowledge the so-called "baggage" of their past. She is the first person to tell Annie about her father's Alzheimer's, as well as the one to inform Eric of his death.

=== The Hastings ===
Julie Camden-Hastings (Deborah Raffin) is the younger sister of Eric. She flies in from New York to be with the Camdens for Thanksgiving. While she is there, she tries to hide the fact that she is an alcoholic. When Simon is playing "Batman", he takes the key to the liquor cabinet, pretending it is the key to Gotham City. Julie tries to get the key back, but when he would not give it to her, she attacks him. Annie runs in and throws her out of the house. Instead of sending her to a hospital, Eric locks her in his bedroom while she starts to go through detoxification. She eventually checks herself into a rehab center. After living in the center for a few months, she goes back to New York to live with her parents, the Colonel and Ruth. She returns to Glenoak two years later to get a fresh start. Back in New York, everyone knows that she used to be an alcoholic and she is fired as a principal because of her drinking.

While in Glenoak, she gets a job as a teacher and falls in love with Hank Hastings, the doctor who almost killed Matt during delivery. The two elope in Eric's church. Julie becomes pregnant and wants to leave Hank because she feels that he was cheating on her with one of his female patients, which is not true. Julie goes into labor at the Camdens' house and Hank delivers the child in Eric and Annie's bedroom. She gives birth to a girl, whom she and Hank name Erica, after Eric and Annie. When Julie and Hank need a babysitter, they take the risk of allowing Mary, who had been quite irresponsible, to babysit. Later, when they cannot get a hold of Mary, they rush back and discover that their place is a mess, the phone is off the hook, a liquor bottle is on the table, and Mary's friends' baby, Mercy, was left with Mary while she was supposed to be babysitting Erica. Julie later wants to leave Hank again when she discovers that he had left his job at the hospital to be the head of a Women's Clinic without discussing it with her first. Eric locks them in a room at the clinic and tells them that they could not come out until they had worked out their problems. They reconcile and Hank learns that Julie is pregnant again. She gives birth to a baby boy. Both she and Hank attend Lucy's wedding.

Dr. Hank Hastings (Ed Begley Jr.) is Julie's husband. He was Annie's doctor when she was pregnant with Matt, which resulted in his premature delivery. Both Eric and Annie are upset that he never apologized for his actions, but he then explains that what happened with them made him go back to medical school in order to be a better doctor. Hank is the main reason why Matt wanted to be a doctor. He unexpectedly delivers Sam and David, and the family is shown to have forgiven him. He starts dating Eric's younger sister Julie, and they get married after discovering that she's pregnant.

Erica Hastings is Julie's daughter. She is born at the Camdens' home, in Eric and Annie's bed, which was given to her parents because of that. Feeling that they want to thank Eric and Annie they name her after them: "Eric", and the "A" after Annie.

=== The Camdens (Eric, Julie, and George's Parents) ===
John "The Colonel" Camden (Peter Graves) is Eric, Julie, and George's father, who used to be in the Marines. Whenever he visits his son's home to visit the grandchildren, he expects military discipline, order and organization, even from his son. He was a Colonel in the Korean War and was evacuated for an unknown reason in 1953. The Colonel and Ruth had Eric out of wedlock before they were married. He met Ruth the same year and they were expecting Eric and had to get married. He first appears in "Seven Is Enough", when he and Ruth go on their annual visit to the Camdens, where they always bring candy that their grandkids dislike. During their visit, they go to a hardware store with Annie, Mary, and Lucy. The cashier, Emma, has rings that are a replica of Annie's stolen ones. She suspects this, but then excuses this thought. The Colonel visits Eric at the church and is forced to put a cigar away because of a church rule. He suspects someone is in the room, and sure enough, a homeless orphan named George was hiding there. The Colonel and Ruth adopt him after Eric lets them. He later appears in "It's About George", where George's biological father Will Grayson is found to be alive and wants his son back. He does not want this to happen, so he is willing to sue. Eric informs his father that he would lose and that Will legally has every right to take George with him, but George refuses to move in with Will and runs away. Eric later creates a compromise and he reluctantly accepts. He also meets Jimmy Moon in this episode, where he and Ruth scare him, but later apologize. He thought that Julie hated him and that he lost all of his children. Julie later confronts him and tells him that she loves him. He and Ruth buy Eric an RV the final episode, though he is not shown.

Apart from his annual visits he also makes occasional surprise visits. In "Lead, Follow or Get Out of The Way", he arrives to help Eric with his major news coverage of his service and in the process helps Mary who is contemplating quitting basketball, Simon, who is training to be a magician (despite the Colonel's dislike for it), and Lucy who is slacking in school, and starts to connect with her.

Ruth Camden (Barbara Rush) is Eric, Julie, and George's mother. She first appears in "Seven Is Enough" on an annual trip to visit Eric and Annie. She gives Lucy the first letter that The Colonel gave to her and both Mary and Lucy read it. She and The Colonel later adopt George at the end of the episode. In "It's About George" she hears that George's biological father Will is alive and plans to legally take his son back. She gets upset and blames Julie for this, but then apologizes. She also meets Jimmy Moon in this episode, where she and The Colonel scare him, but later apologize.

George Grayson Camden (Sam Saletta) is a homeless orphan who went from one foster home to the next until he is found in Eric's office. George informs them that his parents are dead. At first, Eric and Annie want to adopt him, but The Colonel and Ruth become his adopted parents, thereby becoming Eric and Julie's brother. In "It's About George" he meets his real father Will Grayson. It turns out that Will faked his death and plans to legally take George with him. Ruth and The Colonel refuse to give George up and plan to take legal action to keep their son. Eric explains to them that the judge would grant custody of George to his biological father and because Will never signed the adoption papers he has every right to take George. He gets upset about being legally forced to live with Will. George refuses to leave his adopted family behind. He runs away and declares that would rather live at the orphanage. His dad later moves in with him, at The Colonel and Ruth's in Buffalo, New York. In "Tit for Tat", it is revealed that he followed in The Colonel's footsteps and joined the army, serving in Iraq. It was also revealed that he married Jane, who had stayed at the Camden's.

== Other recurring characters ==
=== The Hamiltons ===
Reverend Morgan Hamilton (Dorian Harewood) is a minister at Trinity Church and a close friend of Eric's. He first appears in "No Funerals and a Wedding" where he attends Jenny Jackson's funeral. In "The Color of God", his church building is burnt to the ground by racists, and he and his family are invited to stay at the Camdens'. He speaks at Eric's church, which his entire congregation attends the week after the church is burnt down. He is sad and angry, but is relieved when the Glenoak Community Church gives him funding to rebuild. He later appears in "America's Most Wanted", where he rounds up all of the athletes who had stolen items from the Varsity Cafe and brings them to the courthouse. This causes the manager of the restaurant to drop the charges. He later appears in "Happy's Valentine", where he goes camping with his wife, Eric and Annie. He and Eric secretly call Sgt. Michaels to check the house and make sure everything is okay.

John Hamilton (1996–2001) (Chaz Lamar Shepherd) is the oldest of the Hamilton children. He first appears in "The Color of God." When his father's church is burned down, he stays in Matt's room. At first, the two are not very fond of each other, but this later changes. He later appears in the episode "America's Most Wanted" where he is an eyewitness to Mary stealing a glass from a restaurant as part of a team ritual. He appears in "Happy's Valentine", where he brings a date to the Camdens' while his parents and Eric and Annie are out of town, joining the wild party that Mary and Keesha's friends are throwing. He later becomes Matt's roommate. He later married to a woman named Priscilla Carter at the end of season five, his last appearance on the show.

Patricia Hamilton (Olivia Brown) first appears in "No Funerals and a Wedding" where she attends Jenny Jackson's funeral. Patricia is Morgan's wife, and she is in her second marriage. When her church is burnt down she feels scared until she finds out that the church would have a new security system with volunteer cops. They later have some marital problems, but it is quickly solved. She talks with Annie in "See No Evil, Hear No Evil, Speak No Evil" about the carjacking. She appears in "Happy's Valentine" where she goes camping with her husband, Eric, and Annie. During the camping trip, her ex-husband calls like usual, which drives Morgan crazy.

Keesha Hamilton (Gabrielle Union) is the second oldest Hamilton child. She first appears in "The Color of God" where she stays in Lucy and Mary's room after her family's church is burnt down. She later appears in "America's Most Wanted", where she is an eye-witness of Mary stealing a glass from a restaurant as part of a team ritual. She appears in "Happy's Valentine", where she attends a party that she is partially responsible for. She is a friend of Mary and Lucy's in a few episodes.

Nigel Hamilton (David Netter) is the third Hamilton child. He is a friend of Simon's, and first appears in "The Color of God." Someone makes a racist comment to him, to which Simon responds by punching him to the ground, which results in his being suspended from school. He appears in "What Will People Say?", where he witnesses Simon's embarrassing moment, where his "love letter" was intercepted by a bully. He appears in "Happy's Valentine", where he goes to a movie with Simon, Ruthie, Lynn, Lucy, and Jimmy. He and Simon get in trouble for throwing popcorn.

Lynn Hamilton (Camille Winbush) is the youngest of the Hamiltons, and is Ruthie's friend who first appears in "The Color of God." In "Happy's Valentine," she attends a movie with Simon, Nigel, Ruthie, Lucy, and Jimmy. She and Ruthie fall asleep while the movie is going on. In the second-season episode "See You in September, Lynn comes to Ruthie's defense after Ruthie gets in trouble; the two girls end up in time out together.

=== Chandler Hampton ===
Chandler Hampton (Jeremy London) is the minister who fills in during Eric Camden's heart bypass surgery and subsequent recovery. He is later asked to stay on as an associate to assist Eric with his busy schedule. In season 7, Chandler starts dating Roxanne Richardson (Rachel Blanchard) and they become engaged for a brief time. He was different than Eric was as a minister. He was more fun-loving and cool and relaxed. Chandler came from a wealthy family and his father cut him off when he chose to be a minister. He and Chandler finally reconciled before his father died. He has a twin brother Sid, who is a recovering drug and alcohol addict. In one episode, Eric met Sid and mistook him for Chandler. He became a drug and alcohol counselor and help addicts to get clean. In the eighth season, Sid relapsed and went to rehab. His father left him his money, but he made Chandler the executor of his will. Sid is not ready to inherit the money since he has a drug problem, and it is put in a trust and until he get his act together to earn it. Chandler and Roxanne break up in the beginning of season 8, but remain friends. He later takes in a young boy, and eventually moves to Pennsylvania with his newly adopted son and new girlfriend.

=== Shana Sullivan ===
Shana Sullivan (1998–2002) (Maureen Flannigan) is one of Matt's major girlfriends, who eventually decides to go to New York University. The resulting long-distance relationship between Matt and Shana fails. Shana and Matt eventually break up because Shana meets somebody else named Brett and Matt admits that he is in love with Heather.

=== Robbie Palmer ===
Robbie Palmer (1999–2002) (Adam LaVorgna) is Mary's, and then later Lucy's, boyfriend. He had been with some friends who were drinking underage and they were all arrested. Being a first time offender, he is able to avoid serious punishment by doing community service. The alcohol was not his, but it was his brother's and he covered for him and took the blame. While doing community service, he meets Mary. The two have dates at the Camden house under Eric and Annie's supervision, because they feel they cannot trust Robbie. After a while, Robbie convinces Eric and Annie to let him take Mary to the coffee shop, where his parents met, for Valentine's Day. The coffee shop turns out to be a motel. Mary punches him and leaves. He comes back a few months later to try to win back Mary. The two get back together, get engaged, and plan to move in together. However, Robbie's ex-girlfriend, Cheryl, sees him and Mary together and realizes that he had been two-timing her. She tells Mary, and Mary breaks up with him because she needs to figure out her life.

Robbie comes back a few months later with Cheryl, asking if Eric would marry the two of them because she was pregnant, which is not true, and the two are living together in Cheryl's apartment. Eric later finds Robbie living on the streets, and Robbie tells him that the only reason he was going to marry Cheryl was because she was pregnant, and when he found out she was not, he left, but had nowhere to go. Eric invites Robbie to stay in the Camden house, which does not go over very well with the rest of the family. But in time, everyone came to treat Robbie like a member of the family. He and Mary started dating again and she planned to come home from New York for the summer to be with him. However, her old boyfriend, Wilson West, comes to beg Mary to stay in New York with him. She chooses to be with Wilson, and leaves Robbie heartbroken.

While on the rebound from Mary, Robbie starts to date Lucy, who is on the rebound from her ex-fiancé, Jeremy. They date only a short time before they realize that being together is awkward. Robbie then begins to date Joy Reyes. Mary and Lucy become jealous of Joy and each try to win him back. Joy breaks up with Robbie, and again, he is left heartbroken. He dates Roxanne Richardson, whom he had known since grade seven, for a short while before leaving the Camden house to live in Florida and take care of his sick mother. Robbie has an older brother, Ronald, and a younger brother, Rick.

=== Peter Petrowski ===
Peter Petrowski (2002–2006) (Scotty Leavenworth) is a neighbor to the Camdens; the son of Vic and Paris. Peter is Ruthie's boyfriend in middle school. His father, Vic, was an alcoholic who left his mother when he was young. In the episode "Smoking" it is revealed that Peter smokes. He decides to stop smoking later in the episode because he knows Ruthie does not like that he smokes. His father returns sober in the episode "The Prodigal Father" and both Peter and his mother forgive him. When Peter is caught drinking, Vic is very upset with him and gives him a lecture on how he does not want Peter to make the same mistakes that he himself made. Eventually Peter's mother and father get back together, despite the fact that Peter had previously hoped that his mother would marry Chandler, who she had been dating before the return of her ex-husband. It is revealed (in the season nine premiere) that Peter moves away with his parents the summer before Ruthie starts high school. Ruthie was not too upset about it as she was more upset with Martin for not driving her to school on her first day. He is not seen again until the episode "Leaps of Faith" when Peter's parents, who are having another baby, ask Reverend Camden to marry them. He appears one last time in the episode "Highway to Cell", when Reverend Camden gives Ruthie's cell number to Vic and Vic convinces Peter to call Ruthie. They communicate for a short period through cellphone and even planned to study in Scotland together, however Peter failed a class so his parents did not allow him to go. They once again drift apart.

=== Roxanne Richardson ===
Roxanne Richardson (2002–2004) (Rachel Blanchard) is Kevin's work partner at the local police station, the object of much of Lucy's jealousy but later become close friends with Lucy and they set up girls nights out where Lucy tells Roxanne what's going on in her life with her husband. She was an old crush of Robbie, and Chandler's girlfriend. Later, Roxanne reveals that she has enlisted in the Army and will be deploying to Iraq.

=== Cecilia Smith ===
Cecilia Smith (2002–2004) (Ashlee Simpson) is Simon's girlfriend, who then dates Martin. She later dumps Martin, who loved her but she was not sure she felt the same. Another reason (which is not very clearly shown) might be that she thought Simon was returning—whereas he only came for vacations—and they might get back together (because it would no longer be a long-distance relationship). When Simon comes home (at the end of season eight), it was vaguely revealed that their relationship did not work out, because over the summer Cecilia went away to college, and it was only when Simon begins dating and having sex with Georgia (in season nine) that it is revealed that they had broken up.

Cecilia becomes very close to the Camdens while dating Simon, and even when he leaves to go to college she still spends a lot of time with his family, babysitting the twins, helping out around the house and often being there for meals, this escalates when Annie is away looking after her sick father, she is there so often that Annie becomes jealous of her role in the family, with the twins loving her and saying she is "more fun than Mommy". Annie and Cecilia discuss this and Annie resolves her jealousy when she realizes Cecilia is just trying to help, and she continues to be part of the 'extended Camden family' until she leaves for college.

=== Martin Brewer ===
Martin Brewer (2003–2007) (Tyler Hoechlin) is the only son of the Marine, Beau Brewer. His mother died when he was young and, until he was 16, he lived with his Aunt Betsy, when his dad was deployed. During his sophomore year in high school, the Brewers moved to Glenoak.

Martin walks into the Camdens' life by chance and joins the already-growing over-glut of teen boys there. He follows Ruthie and her then-boyfriend Peter to the Camden house and everyone assumes that he is a friend of Simon's, except Simon thinks that he is there to see his dad. While Martin's aunt, an aspiring fashion designer, wants the two of them to move to New York, Eric manages to convince her to let Martin stay with them so as not to uproot him again.

Martin's favorite sport is baseball and has been scouted by both colleges and professional baseball teams. One team even offers him a contract during his sophomore year in high school (which he eventually turns down to complete his education). Martin lives with the Camdens for two years before his father's tour in Iraq finally ends and he returns home.

He also has fixed, rigid beliefs about sexuality and is staunchly conservative, which pleases most of the Camdens, except Simon. When Martin snoops into Simon's private affairs, Martin harps at Simon about the evils of non-marital sex when he finds out that Simon is sexually active.

Prior to his senior year in high school, while visiting Simon, Martin is not practicing what he preached about pre-marital sex, and has sex one time with a girl named Sandy Jameson. The event results in Sandy getting pregnant.

Martin graduates a semester early and, with the assistance of Eric and his high school baseball coach, starts college. He now lives near Sandy and their son. While Martin is not in the season ten finale, Sandy makes an appearance after the failed wedding of Simon and Rose. It ends with Sandy telling Simon she needs to speak with him (Much speculation surrounded this, that it was in fact Simon's baby). Ruthie falls in love with Martin in the meantime. Finally, near the end of the series, Martin declares his love for Ruthie, but then Ruthie had to choose between Martin and T-Bone. At the end, despite all they have been through, she decides to go with T-Bone, leaving Martin heartbroken.

=== Chief of Police Michaels ===
Chief of Police Michaels (Christopher Michael) first appears in "Saturday" as a Sergeant who assists lost Simon, Ruthie, and Happy; he takes them home, but when they find the house empty, he escorts them to Mary's basketball game, where most of the family converge despite Mary's initial wish. He returns in "See No Evil, Hear No Evil, Speak No Evil" to investigate the Camdens' carjacking. In "Happy's Valentine", Eric and Morgan call him from a camping trip to check on the kids at the house. He catches his son with beer and sends him home thereby ending the wild party. He then notifies Matt that Happy was hit by a car, and he takes her to Abbott Animal Hospital. He also informs Eric when Simon got in the car accident. He is Kevin's boss when he is a police officer. He is later promoted to detective, then to captain. In "Faith, Hope and the Bottom Line," he and Officer McGuire rush over to the Camdens' after Ruthie calls "911", because Simon was hiding in his room. Near the series' end he is promoted to Police Chief of Glenoak. He and Eric are friends and occasionally work together; he refers people to Eric for counseling, Eric accompanies him on death notifications, etc.

=== Meredith Davies ===
Meredith Davies (2004–2005) (Megan Henning) is Martin's ex-girlfriend, who ends their relationship after he told her about Sandy and the baby. Meredith and her siblings were taken in by Cecilia's parents, but were never legally adopted by them due to the meddling of their birth mother. After she and Martin breakup, Meredith's younger sister tells everyone at school that Martin got Ruthie pregnant. After discovering this, Meredith quickly denies the rumor, explaining to her sister that Martin got Sandy pregnant.

=== Sandy Jameson ===
Sandy Jameson (2005–2007) (Haylie Duff) was introduced in the season 10 premiere as Simon's fiancée Rose's best friend, to whom Martin lost his virginity the previous summer. In the season opener, Sandy reveals she might be pregnant. This is later confirmed, and she gives birth to a baby boy named Aaron (after Martin's grandfather). In the season 10 finale, she had to speak with Simon, possibly about the baby's paternity. In season 11, she meets Jonathan, a doctor, and he proposes. Together, they decide to get married, but having gone on the RV vacation, it is unknown whether or not they get married and stay together.

=== Rose Taylor ===
Rosanna "Rose" Taylor (2005–2006) (Sarah Thompson) was introduced (in the season nine finale "Mi Familia Part 1") as Simon's current girlfriend for seasons nine and ten. The two are not necessarily serious but she seems eager to engage and marry, pressuring Simon into proposing. When at first he refuses, she takes it as disinterest in her and backs away, provoking him to commit to marrying her. By season ten they are engaged, and she makes wedding plans. The initial plan was for the two to engage at the end of their current school year and wed at the end of the following year, but she pressures him into moving the engagement date forward. During Rose's time on the show, she becomes a very disliked person by all except for Sandy Jameson, who was her one friend there. Rose is known for being selfish, rude, inconsiderate, and thoughtless, rubbing Eric and Annie the wrong way more than anyone.

By 2006, Simon and Rose change plans to marry in May, something they both wanted to be ready for, but still held insecurities and doubts. Annie, however, decides that they could not marry, and when an ex-boyfriend of Rose's surfaces in March, she sees an opportunity. Though most had come to accept Simon dating Rose, no one knew her at all, and it was this boyfriend who convinces Rose that she is not being a good person. In the episode Invitation to Disaster, she has a sit-down confession with Annie, explaining that she has been unaware of how she was acting and that her relationship with her parents and never really being disciplined or close to them at all is part of the reason. This provokes Annie to see her in a different light, and while she and Annie take on a mother/daughter relationship, no one else is crazy about them marrying. It is her ex-boyfriend Humberto who makes her realize that she is not ready to marry and that he still has feelings for her. So although they had gotten to the wedding day, they end up parting ways amicably. It is unknown whether they still keep in touch.

== Minor recurring characters ==
- Gladys Bink (Eileen Brennan) first appears in the pilot episode, where Eric pays her to pretend that she had lost a lung, breathing on an oxygen tank, and trying to still smoke cigarettes. This trick makes Matt quit smoking. Later, she appears in "With a Little Help from My Friends", where Matt helps her with a few things around the house. But because he does not come help her get her money down from a high shelf, she takes a hard fall and Matt and Eric visit her in the hospital. In "Dangerous Liaisons, Part 2" she visits Mary at the hospital and persuades Annie's father to solve the problem by using her "ways" (i.e. lying). She has been a member of the Glenoak Community Church for many years, and has a reputation of being an excellent fundraiser. At the end of season seven, she is diagnosed with cancer and Chandler moves into her guest house to help her out. Chandler is the minister who married Gladys to her third husband Fred, though without the blessing of Fred's mother. She is the show's most-recurring character.
- Beau Brewer (Costas Mandylor) is Martin Brewer's father, who served 2 tours in Iraq. When he comes home for three days, he does not speak to Martin until the last day, uneasy because it might be their last conversation. The season ten premiere discloses that he started up a landscaping business.
- Betsy Brewer (Keri Lynn Pratt) is Martin's aunt whom he stays with in Glenoak while his Marine dad is deployed in Iraq.
- Heather Cain (Andrea Ferrell) is a deaf girl whom Matt sees at the airport (in "Dangerous Liaisons, Part 1"). He goes over to her house and meets her and her mother, Donna (Meg Wittner). On their first date the next night, Heather runs out of the party after being teased. In "Dangerous Liaisons, Part 2," Eric "lures" Matt to a cafe where deaf people work and eat. Matt meets Heather there. They eventually apologize and say they want to get to know each other. In season two, she goes away to school in Philadelphia and breaks up with Matt in a "Dear John". In season three, she returns and says she's getting married, but in the finale she runs off with Matt on her wedding day after learning that her fiancé cheated on her. In season four, she transfers to Crawford College and sees that Matt is in a relationship with Shana Sullivan. In the season finale, she tells Matt she still loves him and he breaks up with Shana. Matt and Heather decide to elope, but (in the season five premiere) it's revealed that she did not say "I Do" at the altar. She has Annie tell Matt it's over. She later tells Matt she has another boyfriend, but they eventually break up and she moves to New York. In season eight, Matt bumps into her on a flight to Glenoak and she says she's divorced and going back to Glenoak to move back in with her mother and start over. Matt considers going back to Heather, but he decides he loves his wife and apologizes for misleading her. This time he will not try to rescue her so he can be with her. Heather does not wish for Matt to do so either. He runs off to go fix his marriage.
- Cheryl (Barret Swatek) is Robbie's ex-girlfriend, whom he almost marries after they thought that Cheryl was pregnant but ended up not being pregnant. Cheryl also dates Matt for a short while.
- Corey Conway (Alicia Leigh Willis) first appears in "Saturday" as Mary's basketball teammate. Mary is of the few people to stand by her friend when it is revealed that she left her last school because she had a baby at 14. Corey ended up dating Mary's longtime flame Wilson West, also a teenage single parent. In the season nine episode "Fathers," we learn that they have married and become a blended family.
- Lou Dalton (Alan Fudge) works for Glenoak Community Church. He first appears in "Faith, Hope and the Bottom Line," objecting to Eric's plan to hire an ex-convict as the new organist when Mrs. Hinkle retires. At series' end he resigns as head deacon and moves away from Glenoak.
- Daniel (Aaron Staton) is Sandy's school friend, introduced in "Turn, Turn, Turn," who later tells Sandy he's in love with her. Upset, Sandy calls Eric for advice. In "You Take the High Road," Sandy desperately tries to break up with him.
- Frankie (Chyler Leigh) is Mary's friend and co-worker at Pete's Pizza. At Mary's age, she's already married to Johnny—who verbally and physically abuses her—and raising their daughter Mercy, but still drinking, smoking, and doing other drugs. After Frankie and Johnny get busted for marijuana, Eric forbids Mary to have anything to do with them outside of work, but she is unable to comply. Frankie eventually leaves town without her family.
- Odile Hinkle (Peg Phillips) is Mrs. Bink's neighbor and best friend. In "We The People", Mrs. Hinkle provides a rest-stop for erstwhile newspaper-couriers Simon and Ruthie, then literally rides to their rescue. In "Says Who?", Mrs. Hinkle disappears, moving to a seniors' residence without informing anyone, leaving Mrs. Bink and Eric to investigate her disappearance. At one time, she was the organist for Glenoak Community Church, but eventually retires from that position, leaving Eric to find someone else as a replacement.
- Georgia Huffington (Rheagan Wallace) is Simon's ex-girlfriend/lover. She is portrayed as the first girl that Simon had sex with. They almost get married when she tells Simon that she's pregnant, but it is quickly revealed to be a lie. Simon ends their relationship shortly afterwards.
- Jane (Sarah Mason) is a homeless girl who stays at the Camdens'. After her father left her mother, her mother's new live-in boyfriend, whom she meets via the Internet, threatens to harm Jane, causing her to flee. Despite not actually being pregnant, she seeks refuge at the home for teenage mothers, but Lucy turns her down, but she and her friend Margaret are soon invited to move into the Camdens' garage apartment. In "Broken Hearts and Promises," she gets a job at the Dairy Shack. "You Take the High Road" reveals that she used to be married to a soldier, but left him after he started hitting her. In ( "And I'll Take the Low Road"), with help from Kevin when her first husband does not show up for their divorce hearing. She latter gets the divorce papers and In "Tit for Tat," she marries Eric's adopted brother George after the conflict of her first marriage fixed and her divorce goes through. While arguing with T-Bone about his mother coming to see him, she blurts out Eric's heart problems on the Promenade. In "Thanks and Giving," she and T-Bone insist that a salesman donates a bed for Eric and Annie. In the series finale, she announces that her mom is in rehab (her parents used to smoke pot) and her mom's boyfriend is in jail for breaking his probation.
- Jeff (Ryan Bittle) first appears in the pilot episode. He is Matt's best friend since age six, and Mary's crush since age ten. While jogging with Lucy, Mary runs into him and he asks her if she wants help with her foul shot; Matt spies on him while the two shoot baskets. In "In the Blink of an Eye," Jeff asks Mary to go to a party, then an R-rated movie, neither of which she is allowed to attend. In "No Funerals and a Wedding," Jeff attends Mary's grandmother's memorial service at the Camdens'. Mary starts to dislike him as he has become clingy. Later, Lucy tells him that she is sorry that they broke up, even though Mary had not dumped him. When Jeff asks Mary to go steady she refuses as she would rather be his friend then date him. They then end up as friends.
- Johnny (Nathan West) is Pete's nephew and Frankie's husband, who leaves his infant daughter, Mercy, at the Camden's doorstop after Frankie leaves him. He ends up deciding to be a single parent.
- Jordan (Wade Carpenter) briefly dates both Mary and Lucy. He is first seen playing basketball with Mary before the show focuses on his relationship with Lucy. When a teacher catches Lucy slapping Jordan, Mary explains that they were rehearsing a scene from Gone With the Wind. When Lucy discovers that Jordan and Mary intend to attend a co-ed sleepover for the basketball teams, she gets jealous and tries to seduce Jordan, but Matt catches them kissing and escorts her home before anything more serious can happen. In the season three finale, Jordan says he still loves Mary but does not want to hurt Lucy (who overhears). Jordan and Mary's renewed relationship creates a sibling rift; later that day the girls and their boyfriends engage in a kissing contest until Aunt Julie orders the boys to leave; Jordan disappears after this. "We don't speak of him", Mary tells Simon in season four, but when the unpleasant subject does insist on coming up, he's referred to as "Big Lips", such as in "Simon's Home Video".
- Mac (Kyle Searles) is Martin's best friend. Cecilia sets him up with Pam early on. Ruthie has a crush on him during season nine, but does little about it as he is two years older. In season 11, he rents an apartment with Jane and Margaret and falls in love with the latter. He and Margaret later begin dating.
- Margaret (Andrea Morris) is Jane's very shy friend. She gets highly emotional when Annie calls the paramedics because she thinks something is wrong with Eric. She gets a job at the Dairy Shack in "Broken Hearts and Promises." She reveals to T-Bone (in "You Take the High Road") that Jane called his mother and she is coming to see him. She later reveals her past in "And I'll Take the Low Road": Her father abused her mother and she ended up going from home to home. Unwilling to be abused for saying the wrong thing, she became shy. In "Thanks and Giving," she helps Sam and David prepare the song "This Land is Our Land" for Eric, Annie, and Ruthie's homecoming, and reveals her ambition to teach Pre-K. In the series finale, she is offered a college scholarship, but she turns it down and goes on the Camdens' road trip.
- Ms. Margo (Rachel Boston) is Sam and David's teacher who first appears in "A Pain in the Neck." When she feels attracted to Eric, Sam and David tell her that he is their grandfather. This is soon resolved, and Ms. Margo asks Eric and the twins out to dinner; Eric resists her advances and starts homeschooling his sons. When Ben hits on her the same day, she turns up at the Camdens', to Eric's annoyance.
- Mercy is Frankie and Johnny's daughter.
- Jimmy Moon (Matthew Linville) (introduced in the episode, "Family Secrets") is Lucy's first boyfriend. In the episode, "In the Blink of an Eye", he and Lucy go on their first date by watching a French film in the Camdens' living room. However, Eric messes this up by playing country songs. In "See No Evil, Hear No Evil, Speak No Evil", he wants to break up with Lucy because of a school class president election. He later withdraws, followed by Lucy, because they want to stay together. In "Happy's Valentine", he takes Lucy, Simon, Nigel, Ruthie, and Lynn to the movies. He and Lucy see a separate movie (a French film) for their first Valentine's together. His grades in science start to drop, and so Lucy told Mary to tutor him in "Faith, Hope and the Bottom Line". Lucy regrets this, because she thought that Mary was going to steal her boyfriend. The issue is resolved at the end of the episode. In "It's About George", he meets the Colonel and Grandma Ruth Camden, who he declares to be the scariest people he ever met. He breaks up with Lucy (in "Dangerous Liaisons, Part 1") after she changes her hair color. The next year, Lucy gets jealous of anyone with Jimmy Moon. She finally gets to decide between her old boyfriend and her new one, but does not get either of them. He later gets caught up in marijuana, and eventually is the defendant in a crime that Lucy is assigned to have jury duty on. He is arrested for possession of marijuana (in season three's episode "Paranoia"), and Lucy is also arrested while observing him.
- Andrew Nayloss (Will Estes) is the boy that Lucy does not like at first, but then his father sent him away to live in Paris for the summer because Andrew's dad does not like Lucy. When Andrew comes back he tells Lucy that he met a girl from Ohio, who lives in Paris, and that he's having a child and he is going to stay in Paris and live on his girlfriend's family's farm and Lucy is heartbroken when she heard he's moving back to Paris.
- Renee Nicholson (Ashlee Levitch) is introduced (in the episode, "Family Secrets") as a girl that Matt meets at the library two weeks prior, and befriends her. She is expecting a daughter with Lou. When Matt goes over to her house to talk to her, he falls asleep on her couch and does not get back until 5:15 a.m., resulting in his being grounded for three weeks. She later joins the Glenoak Community Church choir, and sings a solo on Sunday. She goes into labor in "No Funerals and a Wedding".
- Pete (James Keane) is Johnny's uncle and the owner of Pete's Pizza.
- Paris Petrowski (Shannon Kenny) is Peter Petrowski's mother. Paris dated once Ben Kinkirk, Lucy's brother-in-law. Later she goes out with Chandler and it seems they will stay together, until her ex-husband appears. She decides to give him another chance and they move away. Later on it is told that she is pregnant and she and her ex are married again.
- Mike Pierce (Jer Adrianne Lelliott) is Lucy's ex-boyfriend who tries to commit suicide from a drug and alcohol combination and as a result, his mother becomes severely depressed and despondent until he helps talk her out of it with Lucy's help.
- Dr. Jonathan Sanders (Nick Zano) is a doctor whom Sandy dates (in season 11). He then proposes to her, to which she says "yes." This causes a conflict between Sandy and Martin.
- George Smith (Brad Maule) is Cecilia's father. He never marries his wife, and never tells Cecilia this fact. After twenty years, Eric marries them in his office. He and his wife eventually become foster parents to the Davis children. He owns a cleaning business, which Simon and Cecelia both work at.
- Deena Stewart (Nicole Cherié Saletta) is Simon's first girlfriend. She eventually moves back east with her family. In the season five episode "Chances", she comes back, and she and Simon start dating again for a while.
- Stanley Sunday (Keith David) is a homeless man seen in the promenade. He is first seen at the hospital, where he goes in for testing. Lucy is supposed to visit him, but she cannot make it, and Eric goes in her place. Stanley ends up convincing Eric to give him his coat, although Eric is hesitant. He appears in the next episode where Kevin goes to him to get some information about what Eric did at the hospital. Stanley convinces Kevin to give up his sweatshirt, shoes and pants. In "You Don't Know What You've Got 'Til He's Gone" Stanley encounters Eric just as he is leaving to go home and asks him if he asked God to let him live. In "Christmas!" it is revealed that Stanley is one of Eric's guardian angels. He is there when Eric was brought to heaven. In the series finale, he joins Eric and the family on their RV.
- Theodore Alan "T-Bone" Bonaducci Jr. (Colton James) is a 16-year-old who works as the ticket vendor at the movie theater in the promenade. He is introduced in And Tonight's Specials Are... when he had pizza with Lucy, which upset Kevin. Two months prior to his stay at the Camdens, T-Bone breaks into Glenoak Community Church to sleep and use the bathroom, since his father is dead, and his mother ran away. Upon staying at the Camdens, T-Bone told Eric that he vaguely knows about what is going on with his health. In "You Take the High Road" he stays at Kevin and Lucy's while Eric and Annie are on a trip to see Ruthie in Scotland. In "Thanks and Giving", he and Jane insist that a salesman donate a bed for Eric and Annie. They both like it, not knowing it was donated. In "You Don't Know What You've Got 'Til He's Gone", he reveals that he likes Ruthie and kisses her. Eric and Annie are glad that Ruthie has found a possible boyfriend, of whom they approve of. In "Can I Just Get Something to Eat" he works with Ruthie on a research project about Darfur. In "Deacon Blues," he and Ruthie discuss the topic of having sex. Kevin tells him not to do it, and when Annie finds out, they are stopped. In "Tit for Tat" Ruthie and T-Bone decided to get tattoos of each other's names and the do buthe only a small one on his ankle of Ruthies initials. He tells Ruthie that he has a fear of sharp objects and that's why he couldn't get more. Ruthie gets his name on her lower back. After an argument Ruthin and Ruthie and T-Bone love each other very much and even get tattoos of each other's names. Well Ruthie gets T-Bone name but T-Bone was scared of the needle so he just got Ruthie's initials R.C. After an argument they break up. Ruthie starts seeing Martin briefly. Martin says he wants to work things out with her but Ruthie chooses T-Bone and then Ruthie and T-Bone get back together. T-Bone's earlier-mentioned father, who is supposedly dead, shows up (in season 11) and convinces T-Bone to go on a road trip with him. T-Bone graduates from high school, and goes on the road trip with the Camden family to meet up with his dad. After the road trip with the family T-Bone and Ruthie plain on traveling the world together.
- Umberto (Fidel Gomez) is Rose's ex-boyfriend who almost marries Rose. He keeps on trying to get Rose back while she is preparing to marry Simon.
- George "Vic" Vickery (Bryan Callen) is Peter's father, who is a recovering alcoholic. He works as a college art teacher.
- Vincent (Thomas Dekker) is Ruthie's boyfriend after Peter. He broke up with her twice.
- Rick Palmer (Lance Bass) is Robbie's younger brother. He goes on a date with a Lucy and they end up making out on a street corner and Eric sees them.
- Brett (Matt Farnsworth) is Shana's roommate and eventual boyfriend. He first appears in "Loves Me, Loves Me Not". He kisses her after Shana and Matt have a fight. He follows Shana out to Glenoak when she came back for the summer. In "Hot Pants" it is revealed that he and Shana are engaged.
- Wilson West (Andrew Keegan) first appears in "Dangerous Liaisons, Part 1." He meets Mary when she is at the park with Ruthie, and asks her out. At first, Eric tries to do anything he can to prevent their date, but he later finds out that he knows his father. Wilson takes Mary to Eddie's Pool Hall, where they play pinball and pool. Michael Towner and a couple of his friends harass him, which ends his date with Mary. He comes to church the following Sunday where he apologizes to Mary. He has a son called Billy, whose mother died in childbirth before Mary met them both. In "Dangerous Liaisons, Part 2," Mary's parents find out about Wilson being a father. Mary dates Wilson a number of times, including when she is sent to Buffalo, to live with her grandparents, they are serious and for a time discuss marriage and Billy wants to call Mary mom, but they break up when Wilson catches her kissing Ben. Wilson eventually decides to move back to Glenoak after meeting and eventually marrying Corey Conway, one of Mary's old basketball teammates who has a daughter.
