= Love Stinks =

Love Stinks may refer to:

- Love Stinks (film), 1999
- "Love Stinks", an episode of Frasier
- "Love Stinks", an episode of Bump in the Night
- "Love Stinks", a season 6 episode of The Loud House
- "Love Stinks", a 2-part episode of 7th Heaven
- Love Stinks (album), The J. Geils Band 1980
  - "Love Stinks" (song), The J. Geils Band 1980
