= Pasadena College (disambiguation) =

Pasadena College is the former name of Point Loma Nazarene University

It may also refer to:

- Pasadena City College
- The fictional institution referred to in I'll Be Home for Christmas
