= 7th Heaven season 4 =

7th Heaven
- Season 4
- DVD cover
- No. of episodes: 22

Release
- Original network: The WB
- Original release: September 20, 1999 – May 22, 2000

Season chronology
- ← Previous; Season 3 Next → Season 5

The fourth season of 7th Heaven—an American family-drama television series, created and produced by Brenda Hampton—premiered on September 20, 1999, on The WB, and concluded on May 22, 2000 (22 episodes).

== Cast and characters ==
=== Main ===
- Stephen Collins as Eric Camden
- Catherine Hicks as Annie Camden
- Barry Watson as Matt Camden
- David Gallagher as Simon Camden
- Jessica Biel as Mary Camden
- Beverley Mitchell as Lucy Camden
- Mackenzie Rosman as Ruthie Camden
- Chaz Lamar Shepherd as John Hamilton
- Maureen Flannigan as Shana Sullivan
- Happy as Happy the Dog

=== Recurring ===
- Adam LaVorgna as Robbie Palmer (6 episodes)

== Episodes ==
No. overall	No. in season	Title	Directed by	Written by	Original release date	Prod. code	Viewers (millions)
67	1	"The Tattle Tale Heart"	Burt Brinckerhoff	Brenda Hampton	September 20, 1999	04299066	8.67
"The Colonel" (Peter Graves) and Grandma Ruth (Barbara Rush) return from being out of the country for six months and Simon surprises them with his new haircut; Matt decides to get his own apartment with John Hamilton; Aunt Julie's new husband Hank (Ed Begley, Jr.) gets Matt a job at his hospital working in the cafeteria; Eric suffers a mild heart attack due to job-related stress.
68	2	"Life is Too Beautiful"	Tony Mordente	Brenda Hampton	September 27, 1999	04299067	8.32
Eric develops a child-like fascination with life when he takes a much-needed vacation after his heart attack, while Annie runs into interference with each of the kids. Meanwhile, Simon assumes the role of the 'man of the house', but feels Matt is undermining his authority by making fun of him; Matt grows uncomfortable with the blossoming friendship between his girlfriend Shana and his roommate John while he's busy with other issues; after taking her father's advice, Lucy finds direction in her life with her interest in Habitat for Humanity.
69	3	"Yak Sada"	Bradley Gross	Elizabeth Orange	October 4, 1999	04299068	7.60
Annie and Lucy join together to protest the mistreatment of women in Afghanistan; Eric counsels a young couple about the importance of sexual equality in marriage; Simon considers dropping out of a cooking class he enjoys because he is the only boy enrolled; Mary helps Ruthie defy convention and play on the school football team; Shana confronts her long-lost father, who abandoned her family 20 years ago.
70	4	"Come Drive With Me"	Anson Williams	Ron Darian	October 11, 1999	04299069	7.44
With Annie and Lucy adding a new bathroom and the family needing a new car, Eric is depending on his built-in annual raise, but when the church deacons get the wrong idea about the family's financial situation, they reject his annual raise, and when Ruthie realizes what's going on, it's up to her to convince them to change their minds. Meanwhile, a young hospital patient (Josh Ryan Evans of Passions) offers Matt career advice, and Simon tries to entertain a classmate who has a crush on him.
71	5	"With Honors"	Harvey Laidman	Sue Tenney	October 18, 1999	04299070	7.81
Mary and her teammate Corey have been selected to receive a prestigious basketball award, but the honor is taken away from Corey when the school discovers that she has been hiding a four-year-old daughter. Meanwhile, Eric and Annie learn that a friend of Simon's is in possession of marijuana; Matt faces disciplinary action after breaking the honor code during an exam; and a classmate wants Lucy, who works in the attendance office, to make some secret changes in the computer system.
72	6	"Just You Wait and See"	Paul Snider	Linda Ptolemy	October 25, 1999	04299073	7.44
A very pregnant Julie appears on the Camdens' doorstep determined to leave her new husband Hank, and Eric takes Hank out to dinner to discuss their issues; while they're out, Julie goes into labor. Unable to transport her to the hospital because Mary, Lucy, and Simon are out, Annie does her best to keep Julie calm, and Hank and Eric return just in time for the birth of Erica. Meanwhile, Lucy is disappointed when her date expects her to be 'the man,' and Simon attracts an older female's attention.
73	7	"Sin…" (Part 1)	Tony Mordente	Catherine LePard	November 8, 1999	04299071	6.87
Mary and her basketball teammates are upset when their coach imposes a lockout on the season, citing that their studies should be top priority. When the school calls a meeting to discuss it, Eric and Annie support the coach's concerns and decisions. Outraged by the apparent betrayal, Mary and some of her teammates break into the gym and vandalize it. They are soon caught by the police and arrested. Meanwhile, Simon is caught making a lewd hand gesture in front of the school and is busted; Matt contemplates returning home; and Ruthie obsesses about being "one of the guys." To be continued...
74	8	"…And Expiation" (Part 2)	Tony Mordente	Catherine LePard	November 15, 1999	04299072	8.11
The Camdens rally after Mary's arrest and she learns that she's losing her college scholarship and faces possible expulsion and jail time. Eric and Annie contact a lawyer, who manages to get her enrolled in a community-service program. Meanwhile, Simon and Ruthie are overwhelmed by guilt because they knew something about Mary's intentions and didn't tell their parents, so they visit different houses of worship trying to attain atonement; and Matt moves back home to help, but soon realizes he needs to live on his own.
75	9	"Dirty Laundry"	Burt Brinckerhoff	Elaine Arata	November 22, 1999	04299074	6.79
A Japanese woman donates $20,000 in reparation money to the church; Ruthie learns a lesson about rejecting others; Matt and Shana reunite after Shana wants to see other people; Lucy decides whether or not to go to a party with girls who have invited her but rejected Mary.
76	10	"Who Nose"	Harvey Laidman	Suzanne Fitzpatrick	November 29, 1999	04299075	9.04
Trying to get extra credit, Simon encounters graffiti artists, one of whom coughs up blood after huffing and threatens Simon not to tell; he's later admitted to the hospital and his mother blames Simon and Eric. Matt is upset at being the last to know that Shana was accepted into New York University. Ruthie wins a prize at school. While on her community service, Mary meets and falls for Robbie Palmer (another worker). She becomes upset with her parents when Robbie gets transferred, but they allow her to have phone calls with him.
77	11	"Forget Me Not"	David J. Plenn	Sue Tenney	December 13, 1999	04299076	6.43
Ginger arrives, not knowing where Charles is and reveals he has been diagnosed with Alzheimer's; later, Charles claims that it's Ginger who has Alzheimer's. Ruthie worries about the millennium. Lucy wants to see a guy instead of doing community work, and her fellow Habitat for Humanity volunteers shun her when they catch her on her date; Simon and Matt spend time together, but it's marred by Matt's worry over Shana. Mary receives good news about her 30-day evaluation, then is angry when Eric won't let her date Robbie. Eric lets him come to the house to see her under their supervision, but Robbie doesn't believe their relationship will work. Matt feels depressed over Shana going to NYU and living with guys in a fraternity house. Eric and Robbie talk, and Mary and Robbie get back together. Charles and Ginger see another doctor about dealing with Alzheimer's, and Annie and Charles share memories from the photo album.
78	12	"All By Myself"	Kevin Inch	Brenda Hampton & Sue Tenney	January 24, 2000	04299077	6.91
Annie takes a getaway with Happy and makes a friend; Simon fights with Deena; Ruthie is in trouble at school; Mary and Lucy are upset that their boyfriends won't call back; Matt reluctantly says goodbye to Shana.
79	13	"Who Do You Trust?"	Joel J. Feigenbaum	Ron Darian & Brenda Hampton	January 31, 2000	04299078	8.97
Simon and Nigel strike up trouble when they buy a pack of cigarettes, ostensibly for a class project; Matt struggles with his and Shana's long-distance relationship; Ruthie makes money from her science experience; Mary and Robbie solve their dating situation by fixing Lucy up with Robbie's brother Rick (Lance Bass) and arranging a double date; John doesn't want Matt's funk to spoil his evening with female visitors.
80	14	"Words"	Burt Brinckerhoff	Sue Tenney	February 7, 2000	04299079	7.17
Simon befriends a shy, insecure classmate afflicted with Tourette's syndrome; his loving mother is supportive, but his stubborn, angry father seems to be hiding something; Simon tries to figure out why Mary's angry with him; Matt gives Shana the silent treatment; Lucy debates telling her mother about a painful secret Ruthie shared with her.
81	15	"Loves Me, Loves Me Not"	Bradley Gross	Brenda Hampton	February 14, 2000	04299080	6.95
The Camdens celebrate Valentine's Day with a special party in honor of the twins' first birthday. After finally gaining her parents' trust, Mary is allowed to have a romantic dinner with Robbie--until she discovers his ulterior motive; Simon and Deena tell their parents that they've given each other love bites; and Matt welcomes ex-girlfriend Heather back into his life, threatening his relationship with Shana.
82	16	"Say a Little Prayer for Me"	Harry Harris	Brenda Hampton	February 21, 2000	04299081	7.07
Reverend Camden encourages his congregation and family to trust in prayer; when Lucy takes the twins for a walk, she gets mistaken for their teen mom; Mary prays to get back with Robbie after what he did and Simon prays that Deena and her parents will like him again; Eric tries to locate a child who wrote him an inspiring, but anonymous, letter.
83	17	"Twelve Angry People"	Tony Mordente	Carol Tenney	February 28, 2000	04299082	6.49
Eric finds himself in a reverse of Twelve Angry Men: he's on the hung jury of what he considers an open-and-shut case and realizes he must help the jurors regain their faith in the legal process to reach a fair verdict. Meanwhile, his family members suffer their own wrongdoings: Annie and Ruthie ponder whether two wrongs make a right; Mary accidentally gives Lucy a black eye; Simon and Deena realize that saying "sorry" can't turn back time; and Matt learns how important one person's voice can be.
84	18	"Hoop Dreams"	David J. Plenn	Jon Bastian	April 10, 2000	04299083	5.99
Mary dreams she's playing basketball with the L.A. Lakers, and believes it's a sign; when a talent scout actually contacts her, she thinks her future is coming back together after all. Meanwhile, Eric and Annie are deeply hurt by comments from two of their kids.
85	19	"Talk to Me"	Tony Mordente	Elaine Arata	May 1, 2000	04299084	4.69
Rev. Camden counsels a sexually-molested girl to help her express the rage and pain she's hiding from her family; weighted by this dark secret, Mary opens up to Lucy. Meanwhile, Simon and Ruthie learn the power of communication with their classmates and friends; and Matt helps Hank reveal something important to Julie before his mother visits.
86	20	"Liar, Liar"	Paul Snider	Brenda Hampton	May 8, 2000	04299085	5.71
Eric and Annie are excited to learn that their family is being profiled in their local newspaper, until the reporter interviews the kids and gets more of an exposé for the innocuous story than he expected.. Meanwhile, a co-worker slanders Matt's reputation at work and his roommate John confronts a politician for misquoting an African-American inspirational leader; and Ruthie's classmate plagiarizes one of her stories for a class competition. (Inspirational singer Sandi Patty has a guest-star cameo.
87	21	"Love Stinks" (Part 1)	Burt Brinckerhoff	Sue Tenney	May 15, 2000	04299086	6.94
Eric and Annie must deal with the emotional fallout of their kids' tumultuous love lives: Mary announces that she's getting together with Robbie and not going to college in the fall; Matt must choose between his girlfriend Shana, who was moved back to Glenoak for the summer, and his ex Heather, who confesses that she still loves him; Lucy dates Robbie's cute brother Ronald, disappointing Andrew Nayloss, who still harbors feelings for her; Deena dumps Simon; Ruthie takes advantage of her new boyfriend. To be continued...
88	22	"Love Stinks" (Part 2)	Burt Brinckerhoff	Sue Tenney	May 22, 2000	04299087	7.43
Simon finds out the real reason why Deena wants to break up with him; Ruthie tries to get back together with Burt and Lucy pursues old flame Andrew Nayloss; Mary decides to take things slowly with Robbie and with her life; Matt and Shana break up and he reconciles with Heather in a cliffhanger-big way.
