= I'll Be Home for Christmas (1998 film) =

1998 film by Arlene Sanford

- Theatrical release poster
- Directed by: Arlene Sanford
- Screenplay by: Tom Nursall; Harris Goldberg
- Story by: Michael Allin
- Produced by: David Hoberman; Tracey Trench
- Starring: Jonathan Taylor Thomas; Jessica Biel; Adam LaVorgna; Sean O'Bryan; Gary Cole
- Cinematography: Hiro Narita
- Edited by: Anita Brandt-Burgoyne
- Music by: John Debney
- Production companies: Walt Disney Pictures; Mandeville Films
- Distributed by: Buena Vista Pictures Distribution
- Release date: November 13, 1998
- Running time: 86 minutes
- Country: United States
- Language: English
- Budget: $30 million
- Box office: $12.2 million

I'll Be Home for Christmas is a 1998 American Christmas family comedy film directed by Arlene Sanford. The plot follows a college student who must make it from his campus in Los Angeles, California to his family's home in Larchmont, New York in time for Christmas dinner in order to win his father's Porsche. It stars Jonathan Taylor Thomas, Jessica Biel, Adam LaVorgna, Sean O'Bryan and Gary Cole. I'll Be Home for Christmas was released on November 13, 1998 by Buena Vista Pictures Distribution to a critical and commercial failure.

== Plot ==
Jake Wilkinson, a student in California, has not been home to Larchmont, New York for any holidays following his biological mother's death and his father's remarriage 10 months later. A few days before Christmas Eve, his father, learning that Jake has traded in his airline ticket to New York for two tickets to Cabo San Lucas, offers to give him his vintage 1957 Porsche 356 if he arrives to their home by 6:00 PM on Christmas Eve for Christmas dinner. Jake's girlfriend Allie Henderson, who was against the trip to Cabo, agrees to ride with him to Larchmont, where her own family also lives.

Jake helps a trio of jocks cheat on their midterm exam, but their comrade, Eddie Taffet, who is Jake's nemesis and rival for Allie's affections, sabotages the scheme. Eddie and the jocks leave Jake in the desert with a Santa Claus suit, hat, and beard glued to his body. While Jake is stuck in the California desert with no way to contact Allie, she reluctantly decides to ride to New York with Eddie.

Jake has only three days to get to Larchmont if he wants the car. He stumbles upon Nolan, a simple-minded thief who is driving stolen kitchen goods to his dealer near New York. A police officer named Max pulls them over in Red Cliff, Colorado for speeding, but Jake manages to convince him that they're donating the goods to the children's hospital. Max offers to escort them to the hospital, forcing them to give away the stolen goods.

Seeing the children inspires Nolan to turn around and head west to see his wife, and Max to try to reunite with his wife Marjorie in North Platte, Nebraska. Max asks Jake to accompany him, reasoning that his wife will listen to Santa. Jake, with the help of a traveling band, gets Marjorie to take Max back, and a grateful Max buys Jake a bus ticket to New York.

Meanwhile, Allie and Eddie grow closer. Allie convinces Eddie to stay the night at a novelty hotel in a Bavarian village, the Edelbruck in Amana, Iowa. They are caught on TV underneath a sprig of mistletoe. Jake sees them kiss while he's waiting at the bus station in Nebraska and develops a scheme to convince the bus driver to drop him off at the Bavarian village. Allie explains the misunderstanding to Jake and they make up, until Jake mentions his deal with his father. Upset that Jake cares more about the car than about her, Allie storms out and takes Jake's seat on the bus.

Jake hitches a ride with Eddie until the latter is suddenly driven by jealousy and decides to throw Jake out of his car near a Wisconsin town. Jake decides to enter a Santa Claus 5K run and use the prize money to buy an airline ticket to New York. Jake wins the race, but when he learns that the town's mayor has a yearly tradition of using the prize money to buy food for the impoverished, he donates the money instead. Meanwhile, Eddie is arrested after insulting two local police officers and his car is towed.

Jake's younger sister Tracey uses her savings to buy Jake a ticket home, but, prohibited from flying without photo identification, stows away in a dog kennel on a cargo aircraft. Jake steals a one-horse open sleigh from the local parade and rides to Allie's house to make up with her. They arrive at Jake's house at 5:59, and he intentionally waits until he is too late to get the Porsche. When his father offers it to him anyway, he refuses, but looks forward to spending the next several holidays at home fixing it up with his father, and he finally accepts his stepmother. The Wilkinsons and Allie get into the sleigh just as the parade arrives and join the procession.

== Cast ==
- Jonathan Taylor Thomas as Jake Wilkinson
- Jessica Biel as Allie Henderson
- Adam LaVorgna as Eddie Taffet
- Sean O'Bryan as Officer Max
- Gary Cole as Mr. Wilkinson
- Eve Gordon as Carolyn Wilkinson
- Lauren Maltby as Tracey Wilkinson
- Andrew Lauer as Nolan
- Lesley Boone as Marjorie

== Production ==
In August 1997, Jonathan Taylor Thomas was in final talks to star in a Christmas comedy film then titled I Won't Be Home For Christmas. While the script was positioned as a vehicle for a "twentysomething" actor, Disney had the script re-written as a vehicle for Thomas as a "a Ferris Bueller-type prepschool upperclassman".

== Release ==
=== Box office ===
I'll Be Home for Christmas made $3.9 million in its opening weekend, finishing at 6th at the box office. At the end of its run, the film grossed $12 million, against its $30 million budget, making it a commercial failure.

=== Critical response ===
On the review aggregator website Rotten Tomatoes, 23% of 43 critics' reviews are positive, with an average rating of 4.1/10. The website's consensus reads: "Neither parent nor child will find any merriment in this mess." Audiences polled by CinemaScore gave the film an average grade of "B+" on an A+ to F scale.

Roger Ebert gave the film 1 star out of 4, and described the film as Pleasantville made from "anti-matter", saying the film is about "people who seem to be removed from a '50's sit-com so they can spread cliches, ancient jokes, dumb plotting and empty cheerful sanitized gimmicks into our world and time". Christopher Null called the film "surprisingly engaging" and gave it 3 out of 5 stars.

== See also ==
- List of Christmas films
