= Kyle Searles =

American television actor (born 1985)

Kyle Searles (born June 24, 1985) is a former American television actor. Searles is best known for his role as Mac on the long-running family drama series 7th Heaven

== Acting career ==
Searles had roles on several television shows in the 2000s, with his first TV credit coming in 2001 as a contestant on the teenage version of Survivor (American TV series) called Moolah Beach. Searles first acting credit was a guest role on a 2003 episode of the NBC drama American Dreams. Searles was cast in Desperate Housewives as John Rowland in the unaired pilot episode; however, he was later replaced by Jesse Metcalfe when the pilot episode was reshot, but he was given a minor role in the new pilot. In 2004 Searles was cast in his best known role as Mac, the best friend and baseball teammate of Tyler Hoechlin character Martin Brewer on the The WB/The CW family drama 7th Heaven (TV series), appearing in 27 episodes throughout the show's final four seasons, the second most episodes by an actor that was never promoted to main cast status, only behind veteran actor Christopher Michael who appeared in 45 episodes across the show's 11 seasons as a law enforcement officer. Searle's second most prominent role was as Jake Kessler, an antagonist on the final season the teen drama South of Nowhere the character of Jake Keller was a manipulative, smooth-talking, opportunistic aspiring music manager and boyfriend of Eileen April Boylan character Kyla Woods South Nowhere ran from 2005 to 2008 on the teen programming block, The N on Noggin (brand) though it was on a small network the show is viewed as cutting edge and ahead of it time especially for having two of the main female characters be in a relationship with each other. Searles had one or two episodes guest spots on Malcolm in the Middle, the George Lopez Show, Veronica Mars and Dawson's Creek. Searles had a recurring role on the short lived drama series Swingtown. His career lasted less then a decade within the 2000's but even so he built a name for himself mostly for his work on family and teen dramas; his final acting credit was a small guest role on a 2009 episode of NCIS.

== Hollywood Demons Interview ==
In 2025 Searle's sat down for an interview as a part of an episode of Drew Pinsky Investigation Discovery documentary series Hollywood Demons, the topic of the episode was his disgraced 7th Heaven co-star Stephen Collins. In his interview Searls said he admired Collins during the making of the show, explaining: “He would drive to work in a beautiful Toyota Prius every single morning when the man was making enough money that he could have been driving up in a Bentley. He could have been decked-out, dressed in the nines, but he was wearing what Jay Leno typically wears, with the blue jeans shirt and jeans. I always felt like I want to be like that. I need to model myself after him more." However, Searles later teared up while watching Collins confess in a 2014 interview with Katie Couric on ABC’s “20/20. to sexual misconduct against three under age girls in 1973, 1982 and 1994 Searles reacted to the admission by saying: “This is the first time that I’ve ever thought that he’s full of shit.”“I have like, a knot in my stomach,” Searle's added. “My whole world changed when I had kids, my whole world view. And certainly my tolerance for this. I think that goes without being said. I just think that maybe I put him up on a professional pedestal a bit too much".

== Personal Life ==
Searles left Los Angeles and moved to McKinney, Texas in 2012, where he started a family. Since 2013, he has been working as a realtor, and he joined the Ohlig Group in 2021.

Searles dated actress Brittany Snow from 2003 to 2005.

== TV credits ==
| Year | Title | Role | Notes |
|---|---|---|---|
| 2001 | Moolah Beach | Himself | Teenage Reality TV game show |
| 2003 | American Dreams | Shane Walden | 1 episode |
| 2003 | Dawson's Creek | Colby | 2 episodes |
| 2003 | Malcolm in the Middle | Jason | 1 episode |
| 2004 | Desperate Housewives | Wake Attendee (uncredited) | 1 episode |
| 2004 | George Lopez | Tom | 2 episodes |
| 2005 | Veronica Mars | Richie | 1 episodes |
| 2005–2006 | Skator Boys | Shane Mewson | unknown |
| 2004–2007 | 7th Heaven (TV series) | Mac | 27 episodes |
| 2007 | Pandemic (mini series) | Ames Smith | 2 episodes |
| 2007 | Tell Me You Love Me (TV series) | Guy uncredited | 1 episode |
| 2008 | Swingtown | Logan Rhodes | 4 episodes |
| 2007–2008 | South of Nowhere | Jake Kessler | 8 episodes |
| 2009 | NCIS | Aaron | 1 episode |
| 2025 | Hollywood Demons | Himself | 1 episode |
