= Sarah Danielle Madison =

American actress (1974–2014)

- Born: Sarah Goldberg; September 6, 1974; Springfield, Illinois, US
- Died: September 27, 2014 (aged 40); Wisconsin, US
- Occupation: Actress
- Years active: 2000–2011

Sarah Danielle Madison (September 6, 1974 – September 27, 2014), sometimes credited as Sarah Danielle Goldberg, was an American actress.

== Early life ==
Madison was born Sarah Goldberg in Springfield, Illinois. She was a 1992 graduate of Latin School of Chicago. She graduated from Amherst College in 1996. When she moved west to pursue a career in acting, she landed a role in Jurassic Park III.

== Career ==
Madison was well known for her recurring role as Dr. Sarah Glass, the wife of Dr. Matt Camden on The WB/CW family drama 7th Heaven. She also played Heather Labonte, a fellow medical resident and love interest to Kyle McCarty (played by Kevin Rahm), on Judging Amy. In 2009, she appeared on the medical drama House as the wife of a pain-ridden, suicidal patient in the episode "Painless". She played Colleen Sarkoissian, Liam's mother on The CW's 90210. She played the girlfriend of the teenagers pulled over in their car in Training Day.

She was sometimes credited as Sarah Goldberg, Sarah Danielle Goldberg or Sarah Danielle. She was also sometimes credited as Sarah Danielle Madison.

== Death ==
On September 27, 2014, Madison died in her sleep during a trip to her family's cabin in southeast Wisconsin. While an autopsy was unable to determine a cause of death, her mother Judy Goldberg attributed her death to a heart ailment.

== Filmography ==
- Ivans Xtc (2000) – Naomi
- Jurassic Park III (2001) – Cheryl Logan, one of Grant's graduate students at the dig site
- Training Day (2001) – Female college passenger
- Virgins (2001) – Tabitha
- Judging Amy (2002–2004, TV Series) – Dr. Heather Labonte
- 7th Heaven (2002–2006, TV Series) – Dr. Sarah Glass
- House (2009, 1 episode)
- Pig (2011) – Woman 2
- 90210 (2009–2011, TV Series) – Colleen Sarkossian (final appearance)
