= Adam LaVorgna =

American actor (born 1981)

Adam Lavorgna
- Born: March 1, 1981 (age 45); New Haven, Connecticut, U.S.
- Occupation: Actor
- Years active: 1991–present

Adam Lavorgna (born March 1, 1981) is an American actor, known for his role on the television series Brooklyn Bridge, and in the films Milk Money, The Beautician and the Beast, and I'll Be Home for Christmas, and as Robbie Palmer on 7th Heaven.

== Early life ==
Lavorgna was born near New Haven, in North Branford, Connecticut, the son of Sandra (née Schnepf), a college professor, and Joseph LaVorgna, a high school assistant principal.

Lavorgna attended high school at Avon Old Farms in Avon, Connecticut. He also enrolled at Boston College, prior to leaving the school after his freshman year to pursue acting, specifically, 7th Heaven.

== Career ==
Lavorgna starred as Nicholas Scamperelli in the series Brooklyn Bridge, for which he received the 1993 Youth in Film Award for Best Actor. In 1998, he joined the movie I'll Be Home for Christmas with Jonathan Taylor Thomas and Jessica Biel. In 1999, he then joined 7th Heaven as a series regular portraying Robbie Palmer, Mary's (Jessica Biel) troubled ex-boyfriend who has moved into the family home. He left the show in 2002. LaVorgna recalled his choice to leave was due to having a hard time managing his way around Hollywood, California, in addition to missing his family, mutually agreeing with the staff of 7th Heaven for a dismissal. He returned to the East Coast.

== Personal life ==
Lavorgna said he was raised Catholic by his grandmother but became distant from the faith with age: "I got away from church at 15–16, and by my mid-20s, I was lost."

LaVorgna went to rehab for opioid and heroin addiction multiple times. The first rehab was paid by 7th Heaven producer, Aaron Spelling. In October 2001, he was at Promises rehab in Malibu.

== Filmography ==
=== Film ===
| Year | Title | Role | Notes |
|---|---|---|---|
| 1991 | 29th Street | Frankie (age 8) | |
| 1994 | Monkey Trouble | Mark | |
| 1994 | Milk Money | Brad | |
| 1997 | The Beautician and the Beast | Karl Pochenko | |
| 1998 | I'll Be Home for Christmas | Eddie Taffet | |
| 1999 | Outside Providence | Tommy the Wire | |
| 1999 | The Bumblebee Flies Anyway | Mike | |
| 2000 | Blast | Shnetz | |
| 2005 | The House Is Burning | Party guest | |
| 2007 | The Boy Who Cried Bitch: The Adolescent Years | Steve | |
| 2015 | Masterless | Kane Madison / Ronin | |
| 2015 | Stealing Chanel | Giorgio Bene | |
| 2016 | Get Happy! | Bobby | |
| 2018 | Madhouse Mecca | Benjamin | |
| 2019 | Finding Julia | Jason Rodriguez | |
| 2022 | Off-Time | Cliff Raines | |

=== Television ===
| Year | Title | Role | Notes |
|---|---|---|---|
| 1991–1993 | Brooklyn Bridge | Nicholas Scamperelli | Main role |
| 1992 | Lifestories: Families in Crisis | Joey DiPaolo | Episode: "Blood Brothers: The Joey DiPaolo Story" |
| 1992 | Sinatra | Frankie at 10 | Miniseries |
| 1993 | Casualties of Love: The "Long Island Lolita" Story | Paulie Buttafuoco | TV movie |
| 1993 | Civil Wars | Eddie Baron | Episode: "Captain Kangaroo Court" |
| 1993 | Empty Nest | Rudy | Episode: "The All-American Boy - Not!" |
| 1994 | The Cosby Mysteries | Teddy | Episode: "Self Defense" |
| 1995 | Matlock | Matt Ahern | Episode: "The Getaway" |
| 1995 | Degree of Guilt | Carlo Paget | Miniseries |
| 1998 | Law & Order | Hayden | Episode: "Damaged" |
| 1999–2002 | 7th Heaven | Robbie Palmer | Recurring role (season 4); main role (seasons 5–7) |
| 2005 | Law & Order: Trial by Jury | Carter McSherry | Episode: "Truth or Consequences" |
| 2006 | Law & Order: Criminal Intent | Brian Murphy | Episode: "Siren Call" |
| 2007 | Cold Case | Joe Vives-Alvarez (2007) | Episode: "Stand Up and Holler" |
| 2007 | CSI: Miami | Eddie Corbett | Episode: "Rush" |
