= Hallow (disambiguation) =

To hallow is to make sacred or holy; to sanctify, consecrate, or to venerate.

Hallow, or variations, may refer to:

- Hallow, Worcestershire, a place in England
- Hallows (surname), including a list of people with the name
- Hallowes, a surname, including a list of people with the name
- The Hallow, a 2015 horror film
- Hallow (album), a 2017 album by Duke Special
- Hallow (app), a Catholic meditation and prayer app

== See also ==
- Allhallowtide
  - Hallow-e'en (All Hallows' Eve), October 31st
  - All Hallows' Day (All Saints' Day), November 1st
- All Hallows (disambiguation)
- All Hallows' Eve (disambiguation)
- Hallowed Be Thy Name (disambiguation)
- Hallowed Ground (disambiguation)
- Deathly Hallows (disambiguation)
- Unhallowed (disambiguation)
