= Catalepsy =

Abnormal maintenance of postures

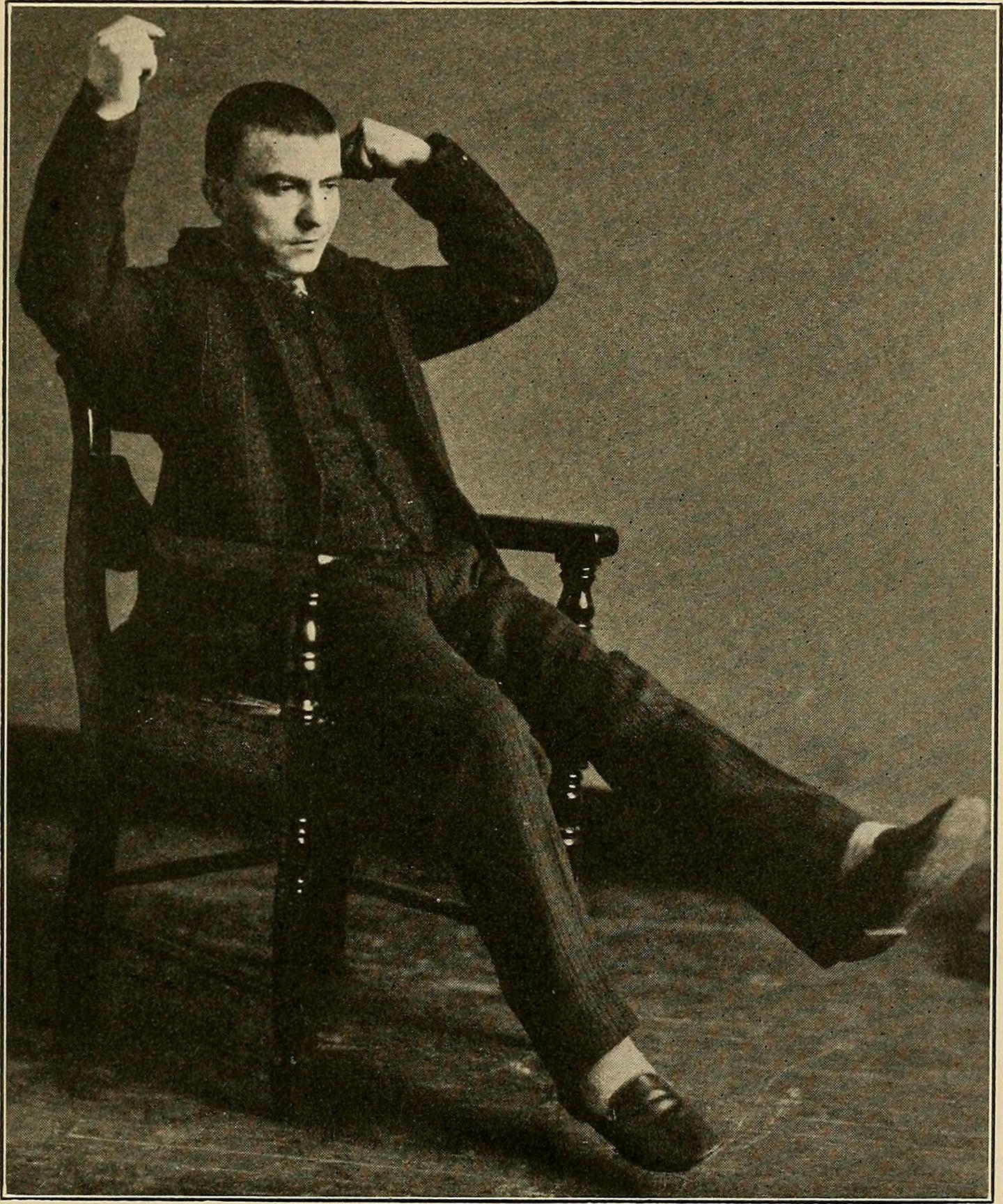
- Catalepsy
- Specialty: Psychiatry, Neurology

Catalepsy (from Ancient Greek katálēpsis, κατάληψις, "seizing, grasping") is a neurological condition characterized by muscular rigidity and fixity of posture regardless of external stimuli, as well as decreased sensitivity to pain.

== Signs and symptoms ==
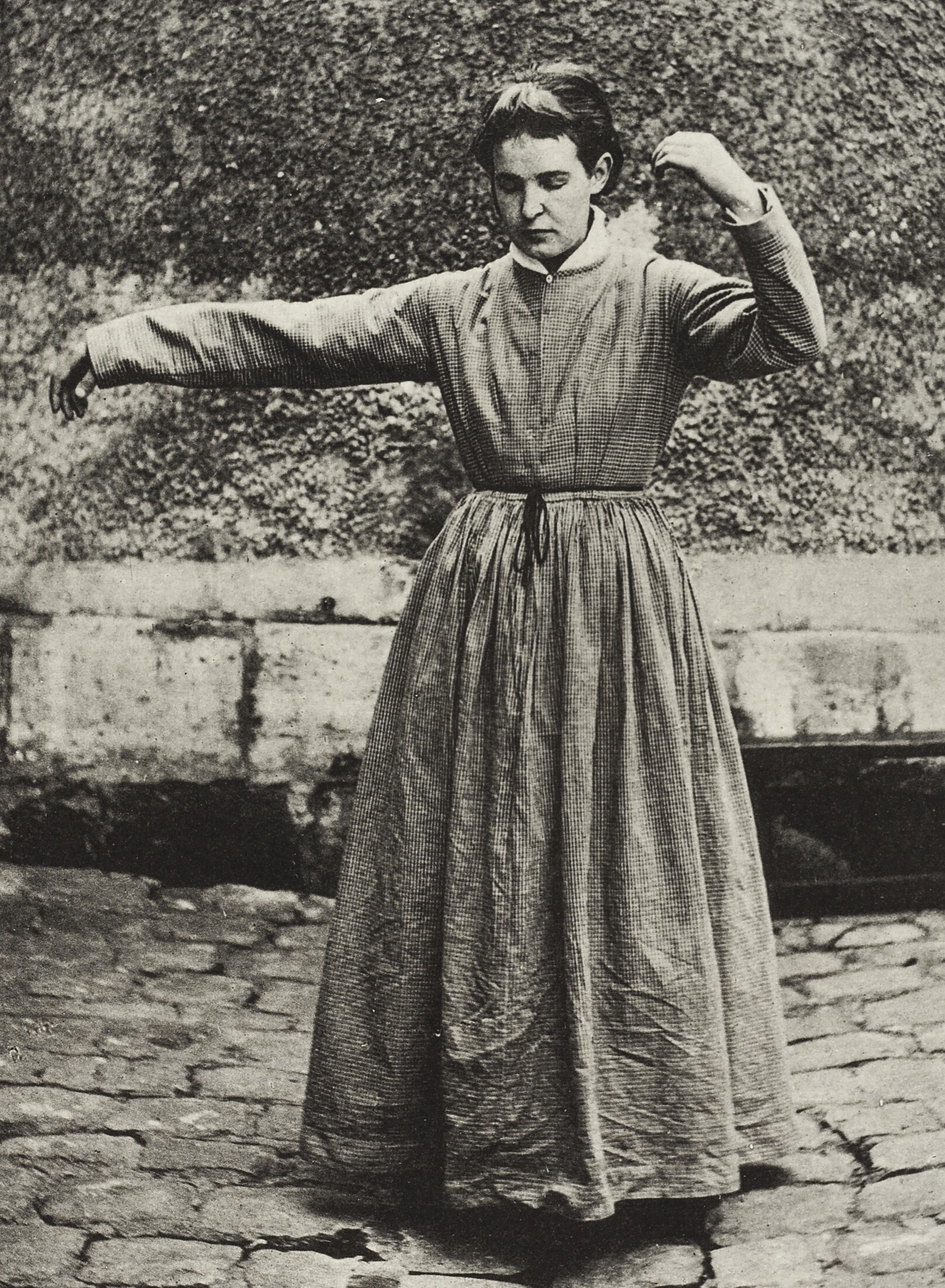
A patient with depression and catalepsy

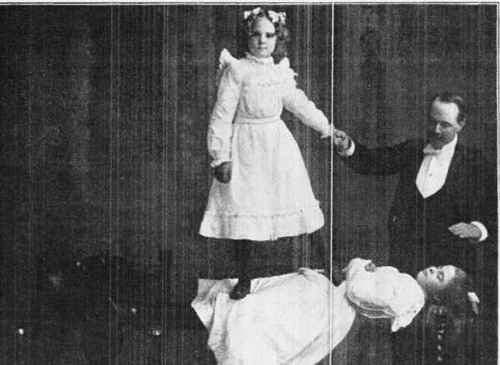
Rigidity of the body produced by catalepsy

Symptoms include a rigid body, rigid limbs, limbs staying in same position when moved (waxy flexibility), no response, loss of muscle control, and slowing down of bodily functions, such as breathing.

== Causes ==
Catalepsy is a symptom of certain nervous disorders or conditions such as Parkinson's disease and epilepsy. It is also a characteristic symptom of cocaine withdrawal, as well as one of the features of catatonia. It can be caused by schizophrenia treatment with anti-psychotics, such as haloperidol, and by the anesthetic ketamine. Protein kinase A has been suggested as a mediator of cataleptic behavior. Unsuggested waxy catalepsy, sometimes accompanied by spontaneous anesthesia, is seen as an indicator of hypnotic trance. Suggested or induced rigid catalepsy, of extended limbs or even the entire body, sometimes tested with heavy weights, has been a staple of stage hypnosis shows and even academic demonstrations of hypnotism since the late 18th century, as proof of extraordinary physical abilities possible in trance states. Such demonstrations have also been performed by Asian martial artists and attributed to the pneumatic vital energy known as qi.

== Historical cases ==
Armand D'Angour suggests that reports (such as that recounted in Plato's Symposium) of Socrates, in about 429 BC, standing perfectly still for hours on end during the Athenian campaign against Potidaea while seemingly deep in thought, are "too extreme to be considered wholly a matter of rational choice," and that "it is reasonable to suppose that it was the symptom of an underlying physiological or psychological condition", such as catalepsy.

St. Teresa of Avila experienced a prolonged bout of catalepsy that began in 1539. This episode was precipitated by the stress she experienced at the Carmelite Convent of the Incarnation. Her legs became rigid, leaving her an invalid for three years. Teresa endured intermittent attacks of catalepsy from then on.

Rufina Cambaceres, an Argentine socialite, is well known in Buenos Aires for her tragic death in 1902. The 19 year-old girl experienced a bout of catalepsy on the day of her birthday, May 31, 1902. The night of her burial in the family mausoleum, the caretaker of La Recoleta Cemetery heard noises coming from her vault. He found the coffin was not in the right position, with scratch marks on the inside of the lid and the girl's face. Rufina had been buried alive. The reason for her bout of catalepsy has never been fully clarified but it was presumed later by doctors that she died of exhaustion or shock after waking up.

== Artistic depictions ==
In the arts, catalepsy is often used for dramatic effect, sometimes as a plot device.

=== Literature ===
Friar Laurence
...Take thou this vial, being then in bed,
And this distilléd liquor drink thou off;
When presently through all thy veins shall run
A cold and drowsy humour, for no pulse
Shall keep his native progress, but surcease:
No warmth, no breath, shall testify thou livest;
The roses in thy lips and cheeks shall fade
To paly ashes, thy eyes' windows fall,
Like death, when he shuts up the day of life;
Each part, deprived of supple government,
Shall, stiff and stark and cold, appear like death:
And in this borrow'd likeness of shrunk death
Thou shalt continue two and forty hours,
And then awake as from a pleasant sleep ...

— William Shakespeare
Romeo and Juliet
Act IV scene I

(Account of character Jem Rodney, the molecatcher)
... coming up to him he saw that Marner's eyes were set like a dead man's, and he spoke to him and shook him, and his limbs were stiff, and his hands clutched the bag as if they'd been made of iron. ... No, no; it was no stroke that would let a man stand on his legs, like a horse between the shafts, and then walk off as soon as you can say "Gee!" But there might be such a thing as a man's soul being loose from his body, and going out and in, like a bird out of its nest and back; and that was how folks got over-wise, for they went to school in this shell-less state to those who could teach them more than their neighbours could learn with their five senses and the parson.

(Narrator)
... a peculiar interest had been centred in him ever since he had fallen at a prayer meeting into a mysterious rigidity and suspension of consciousness which, lasting for an hour or more, had been mistaken for death.

— George Eliot
Silas Marner
- In William Shakespeare's tragedy Romeo and Juliet, the kindly Friar Laurence (in the course of a botched attempt to help the lovers) provides Juliet with a catalepsy-inducing potion so effective that Romeo tragically imagines his beloved's deathlike trance to be actual death and poisons himself in despair just before she awakens from her stupor—leading her to kill herself with his dagger upon discovering his suicide.
- In Alexandre Dumas, père's novel The Count of Monte Cristo, the Abbé Faria has fits of catalepsy from time to time, before eventually dying from one.
- In Eugène Sue's The Mysteries of Paris, the villain Jacques Ferrand experiences a fit described as cataleptic in his final confrontation with Rodolphe, blinded by lamplight and hallucinating with visions of his fantasized Cecily.
- In George Eliot's Silas Marner, the main character Silas Marner frequently has cataleptic fits and seizures, which adds to his uncanny reputation as a wizard or "cunning man" among the superstitious natives of his adopted village of Raveloe.
- In Arthur Conan Doyle's "The Adventure of the Resident Patient", a man feigns catalepsy to gain access to a neurologist's rooms; the doctor attempts to treat him with amyl nitrite.
- In Ford Madox Ford's The Good Soldier, the protagonist Dowell experiences catalepsy following the death of his wife.
- In Robert A. Heinlein's Stranger in a Strange Land, the main character Valentine Michael Smith is believed to have catalepsy when he is returned to Earth.
- In Edgar Allan Poe's "The Premature Burial", the narrator develops catalepsy. He fears being mistakenly declared dead and buried alive, and goes to great lengths to prevent this. In another of Poe's short stories, "The Fall of the House of Usher", Madeline Usher has catalepsy and is buried alive by her unstable brother Roderick. Catalepsy is also depicted in "Berenice", thus becoming one of the recurrent themes in Poe's fiction.
- In Poppy Z. Brite's Exquisite Corpse, the main character—Compton, a serial killer facing a lifetime sentence—uses shamanistic techniques to induce catalepsy and, convincingly appearing deceased, is able to escape prison.
- In Émile Zola's short story "La Mort d'Olivier Becaille" ("The Death of Olivier Becaille"), the title character is buried alive and notes that "I must have fallen into one of those cataleptic states that I had read of."
- In Sax Rohmer's Fu Manchu novels, Dr. Fu Manchu has a serum that induces a state of catalepsy so extreme as to be indistinguishable from death.
- In Charles Dickens's novel Bleak House, Mrs. Snagsby has violent spasms before becoming cataleptic and being carried upstairs like a grand piano.
- In Hegel's Lectures on the History of Philosophy: Greek Philosophy to Plato, Hegel describes Socrates as having catalepsy caused by magnetic somnambulism when in deep meditation.
- In Charles Williams's novel Many Dimensions, Sir Giles Tumulty says to Lord Arglay, the Chief Justice of England: "You are a louse-brained catalept, Arglay."
- In Philip K. Dick's novel Now Wait for Last Year, Kathy Sweetscent becomes immobilized by withdrawal from JJ-180, an alien (and highly addictive) drug. "My God, Kathy thought as she stood gazing down at the record by her feet. I can't free myself; I'm going to remain here, and they'll find me like this and know something's terribly wrong. This is catalepsy!"
- In the second chapter of Álvares de Azevedo's Noite na Taverna, character Solfieri rescues a woman who has catalepsy from inside a coffin.
- In Sheridan Le Fanu's novella The Room in the Dragon Volant, a naïve young man falls foul of a criminal gang who employ a curious, bulbocapnine-like drug which induces catalepsy, as a result of which he narrowly escapes premature burial.
- In the Ted Hughes poem titled "Conjuring in Heaven" from Crow, the eponymous character is left in a state of catalepsy.

=== Other media ===
- In the radio show Suspense, the episode titled "Dead Ernest" recounts how a man with catalepsy is wrongly believed dead when he is struck by a car.
- In the movie Son of Dracula (1943), vampire hunter Professor Lazlo (J. Edward Bromberg) describes a vampire as being in a "cataleptic state" between sunrise and sunset, but practically "invincible" during the nighttime, to Dr. Harry Brewster (Frank Craven), as they look for answers to a number of strange situations involving Count Alucard (Lon Chaney Jr.).
- In the movie The Comedy of Terrors (1963), John Black (Basil Rathbone) is stated to suffer from catalepsy, and is mistaken for dead several times throughout the movie.

== See also ==
- Mood disorder § Depressive disorders
