= All Hallows School =

All Hallows School may refer to:

- All Hallows Catholic School, Weybourne, Surrey, England
- All Hallows Catholic High School, Penwortham, Lancashire, England
- All Hallows High School, South Bronx, New York, United States
- All Hallows Roman Catholic High School, Salford, Greater Manchester, England
- All Hallows' School, Brisbane, Australia
  - All Hallows' School Buildings, the heritage-listed buildings at All Hallows' School, Brisbane
- All Hallows Preparatory School, East Cranmore, Shepton Mallet, Somerset, England

== See also ==
- All Hallows College, a college of higher education in Dublin
- All Hallows Catholic College, Macclesfield
- All Hallows (disambiguation)
