= Nonentity =

Nonentity may refer to:

- The Nonentity, a 1922 British silent adventure film
- Nonentity (Water III: Fan Black Dada), a 1988 album by experimental rock composer Zoogz Rift
