= All Hallows =

All Hallows or Allhallows may refer to:

- All Saints' Day, a Christian feast day
  - Allhallowtide, a Christian liturgical season
  - Halloween, or All Hallows' Eve

== Places ==
- Allhallows, Cumbria, England, UK
- Allhallows, Kent, and Allhallows-on-Sea, England, UK

== Churches and religious orders ==
=== London, England ===
- All Hallows, Bow
- All Hallows-by-the-Tower
- All Hallows Honey Lane (destroyed 1666)
- All Hallows-on-the-Wall
- All Hallows, Bread Street (demolished 1878)
- All Hallows Lombard Street (demolished 1937)
- All Hallows Staining (demolished 1873, but tower survives)
- All-Hallows-the-Less (destroyed 1666)
- All-Hallows-the-Great (demolished 1894)
- All Hallows' Church, Tottenham
- All Hallows, Twickenham

=== Elsewhere in England ===
- Bispham Parish Church, known as All Hallows, Lancashire
- All Hallows Church, Great Mitton, Lancashire
- All Hallows Church, Clixby, Lincolnshire (redundant)
- Church of All Hallows, Allerton, Liverpool
- All Hallows Church, Wellingborough, Northamptonshire
- All Hallows' Church, Ordsall, Nottinghamshire
- All Hallows' Church, Sutton-on-the-Forest, North Yorkshire
- All Hallows' Church, Harthill, South Yorkshire
- All Hallows Church, Seaton, Rutland
- Community of All Hallows, Ditchingham, Suffolk
- All Hallows Church, Bardsey, West Yorkshire

=== Other countries ===
- Priory of All Hallows, Dublin, Ireland, dissolved in the Reformation
- All Hallows Episcopal Church, Snow Hill, Maryland, US
- All Hallows Church (South River, Maryland), US

== Education ==
- All Hallows School (disambiguation)
- All Hallows College, Dublin, Ireland
- Allhallows College, Dorset, England
- All Hallows Catholic College, Macclesfield, Cheshire, England

== Other uses ==
- All Hallow's E.P., a 1999 album by the band AFI
- All Hallows, the journal of the Ghost Story Society

== See also ==
- All Hallows' Eve (disambiguation)
- All Saints Church (disambiguation)
- Hallow (disambiguation)
