= War in Heaven (novel) =

1930 novel written by Charles Williams

- Author: Charles Williams
- Language: English
- Genre: Supernatural fiction, thriller
- Publisher: Victor Gollancz Ltd
- Publication date: 1930
- Publication place: United Kingdom
- Media type: Print
- Pages: 256
- Followed by: Many Dimensions

War in Heaven is a 1930 novel written by Charles Williams. It is the first of his supernatural novels that C. S. Lewis styled "spiritual shockers" and T. S. Eliot called "supernatural thrillers". The novel traces a humble Anglican priest's struggle with a satanic cabal who are bent on stealing the Holy Graal and using it for dark magic.

== Plot ==
The novel begins with the discovery of a dead body in the London offices of a publishing house owned by the wealthy Gregory Persimmons. The victim is found in the office of Lionel Rackstraw, an editor at the firm.

Persimmons discovers that a chalice housed in the sleepy parish church of Fardles may be the actual Holy Graal. He desires the artifact for use in his occult rituals and attempts to purchase it. A local Archdeacon also discovered that his simple chalice may be the real Graal, and decides to protect it from Persimmons, just in case. He suffers manipulation, threats, assault, and burglary for his decision.

Persimmons grooms and eventually kidnaps Rackstraw's four-year-old son to experiment with the Graal's magical capacity. The Archdeacon gets help to retrieve and protect the Graal from Mornington, an employee at the publishing house, and the Duke of the North Ridings.

The conflict escalates into a battle between demonic forces and divine intervention (the eponymous war in heaven). While Persimmons's accomplices try to destroy the Graal through dark sorcery, the Archdeacon and his colleagues pray intensely to shield it. Ultimately, the forces of light are aided by the sudden manifestation of Prester John, the legendary protector of the Graal. Persimmons is defeated and arrested for the murder that initiated the story. The Graal disappears, and the Archdeacon dies peacefully at the altar.

== Publication ==
War in Heaven (1930), Williams' first published novel, almost did not see the light of day. Williams had been kind to a junior typist at Oxford University Press, who agreed to read his manuscript in return—partly because she had nothing better to read that day. She eventually recommended it for publication.

== Themes ==
Sorina Higgins cited War in Heaven's opening "glorious sentence" which reads: "The telephone bell was ringing wildly, but without result since there was no one in the room but the corpse." She continued, "After this auspicious opening, the book unravels into a fantastic tale of the Holy Graal, black magic, and devil worship. One would be tempted to call Williams a proto-Dan Brown, with his flair for theological conspiracy tales."

The novel also draws upon Williams's own interest in the occult (he was briefly a member of the Fellowship of the Rosy Cross) by detailing rituals of black magic, demonic possession, and the contrast between unholy occult spirituality and the power of humble, orthodox Christian spirituality.
