= Ipecac (disambiguation) =

Ipecac may refer to:

- Syrup of ipecac, an emetic drug
- Carapichea ipecacuanha, the plant from which syrup of ipecac is derived
- Ipecac Recordings, an American record label
- Ipecac (album)
