= Halloween 4 (disambiguation) =

Halloween 4: The Return of Michael Myers is a 1988 film in the Halloween franchise.

Halloween 4 or Halloween IV may also refer to:

- "Halloween IV" (Brooklyn Nine-Nine), a 2016 television episode
- "Halloween IV" (Roseanne), a 1992 television episode
- "Halloween IV: The Ghost Story", a 2013 episode of The Middle
- "Halloween 4: The Revenge of Rod Skyhook", a 2016 episode of Modern Family

== See also ==
- Halloween 5: The Revenge of Michael Myers (1989), the fourth film to feature the characters Michael Myers and Dr. Loomis; a direct sequel to Halloween 4
- Halloween: Resurrection (2002), the fourth film to feature the character Laurie Strode; a direct sequel to Halloween: H20
- Halloween (franchise)
- Halloween (disambiguation)
- List of Halloween television specials
