= Halloween 3 (disambiguation) =

Halloween 3 or variation may refer to:

== Film ==
- Halloween III: Season of the Witch (1982 film), the third film in the Halloween film franchise, unrelated to the original first two films

== Television ==
- Halloween 3: AwesomeLand (2014 TV episode), episode 6 of season 6 (126th episode) of Modern Family
- Halloween III (1995 TV episode) Halloween special for Dr. Quinn, Medicine Woman, see List of Halloween television specials
- Halloween III: The Driving (2012 TV episode) season 4 episode 6, Halloween special, for The Middle, see List of Halloween television specials
- Halloween III (2015 TV episode) Halloween special for Brooklyn Nine-Nine, see List of Halloween television specials

== Other ==
- Halloween III: The Devil's Eyes, a 2001 comic book written by Phil Nutman from Chaos! Comics

== See also ==
- Halloween (franchise)
- Halloween (disambiguation)
