= Halloween (disambiguation) =

Halloween is an annual celebration on October 31.

Halloween may also refer to:

== Film ==
- Hallowe'en (1931 film), a Toby the Pup cartoon
- Halloween (franchise), an American horror franchise including films and related merchandise
  - Halloween (1978 film), a film by John Carpenter
    - Halloween (1978 soundtrack), the soundtrack to the 1978 film
  - Halloween (2007 film), a remake by Rob Zombie
  - Halloween (2018 film), a sequel to the 1978 film, by David Gordon Green
    - Halloween (2018 soundtrack), the soundtrack to the 2018 film

== Literature ==
- Halloween: A Holiday Book, a 1963 children's book by Lillie Patterson
- Halloween (children's book), a 2002 children's book by Jerry Seinfeld
- Halloween (novel), a 1979 novelization of the 1978 film
- "Halloween" (poem), a 1785 poem by Robert Burns
- "Halloween: A Romaunt", an 1842 poem by A. Cleveland Coxe
- "Halloween", an issue of the comics series W.I.T.C.H.
- Halloween, a character in the manga series MÄR
- Halloween, a character in Nick Sagan's novel trilogy Idlewild

== Music ==
=== Groups ===
- Halloween (band), an American heavy metal band formed in 1983

=== Albums ===
- Halloween (Frank Zappa album) (2003)
- Halloween (G.G.F.H. album) (1994)
- Halloween (Mannheim Steamroller album) (2003)
- Halloween (Two Steps from Hell album) (2012)
- Halloween (EP), a 2009 EP by Zombie Girl
- Halloween, a 1977 album by Pulsar

=== Songs ===
- "Halloween" (Dave Matthews Band song), 1998
- "Halloween" (Dead Kennedys song), 1982
- "Halloween" (Kodak Black song), 2017
- "Halloween" (Matt Pond PA song), 2005
- "Halloween" (Misfits song), 1981
- "(Every Day Is) Halloween", by Ministry, 1984
- "Halloween", by Aqua from Aquarius, 2000
- "Halloween", by Ash, a B-side of "A Life Less Ordinary", 1997
- "Halloween", by the Dream Syndicate from The Days of Wine and Roses, 1982
- "Halloween", by Helloween from Keeper of the Seven Keys, Pt. 1, 1987
- "Halloween", by Japan from Quiet Life, 1979
- "Halloween", by King Diamond from Fatal Portrait, 1986
- "Halloween", by Noah Kahan from Stick Season, 2022
- "Halloween", by Phoebe Bridgers from Punisher, 2020
- "Halloween", by Siouxsie and the Banshees from Juju, 1981
- "Halloween", by Sonic Youth, a B-side "Flower", 1986
- "Halloween", by Zoogz Rift from Water II: At Safe Distance, 1987
- "Halloween", from the Be More Chill soundtrack

=== Compositions ===
- Hallowe'en (Ives), a 1907 composition for string quartet and piano by Charles Ives

== Television episodes ==
- "Halloween" (7th Heaven)
- "Halloween" (8 Simple Rules)
- "Halloween" (The Amazing World of Gumball)
- "Halloween" (American Horror Story)
- "Halloween" (Be Cool, Scooby-Doo!)
- "Halloween" (Brooklyn Nine-Nine)
- "Halloween" (Buffy the Vampire Slayer)
- "Halloween" (Dr. Quinn, Medicine Woman)
- "Halloween" (The Fitzpatricks)
- "Halloween" (Frasier)
- "Halloween" (Life Goes On)
- "Halloween" (Malcolm in the Middle)
- "Halloween" (Mike Hammer, Private Eye)
- "Halloween" (Modern Family)
- "Halloween" (The New Lassie)
- "Halloween" (The Office)
- "Halloween" (Phil of the Future)
- "Halloween" (Riverdale)
- "Halloween" (Teen Titans Go!)
- "Halloween" (That '70s Show)
- "Halloween" (Thomas & Friends)
- "Halloween" (Totally Spies!)
- "Halloween" (Wizards of Waverly Place)
- "Halloween" (Yes, Dear)
- "Halloween" (Yo Gabba Gabba!)
- "Halloween", an episode of Bananas in Pyjamas
- "Halloween", an episode of Fireman Sam
- "Halloween!", an episode of Oobi
- "Halloween", an episode of My So-Called Life
- "Halloween", an episode of Strange Experiences
- "Halloween", an episode of Suddenly Susan
- "Halloween", an episode of You Can't Do That on Television

== Video games ==
- Halloween (video game), a 1983 release on the Atari 2600 by Wizard Video
- Halloween: The Game, a 2026 release by IllFonic
- Feud (video game) or Halloween, a 1987 cross-platform adventure game by Bulldog

== Other uses ==
- Hallowe'en (clipper), an iron clipper ship launched in 1870
- Halloween (horse), a British-trained racehorse active in the 1950s
- Halloween (wrestler) or Manuel Ortiz (born 1971), professional wrestler
- Halloween Martin, American disc jockey (1900–1971)
- "Halloween", episode 19 of the second season of the web series Angry Video Game Nerd (2007)

== See also ==
- All Hallows' Eve (disambiguation)
- Halloween asteroid (disambiguation)
- Halloween party
- Halloween Problem, a phenomenon in database updates
- Halloween II (disambiguation)
- Halloweenie, a song
- Helloween, a German power metal band
- "C'est l'Halloween", a 1984 Canadian French-language song
