= Hollow Ground =

Hollow Ground may refer to:

- Hollow Ground (band), an English heavy metal music band
- Hollow Ground (album), 2018 album by American musician Cut Worms
- hollow grind, a way in which a knife blade may be ground

See also:

- Hallowed Ground
