= Island of Living Puke =

Studio album by Zoogz Rift
- Released: 1986
- Recorded: April 1986
- Studio: Radio Tokyo (Los Angeles, CA)
- Genre: Experimental rock
- Length: 35:02
- Label: SST (077)
- Producer: Zoogz Rift

Zoogz Rift chronology
| Interim Resurgence (1985) | Island of Living Puke (1986) | Looser Than Clams... A Historical Retrospective (1986) |

Professional ratings
Review scores
| Source | Rating |
|---|---|
| Allmusic | 4.5/5 stars |

Island of Living Puke is the fifth studio album by Zoogz Rift, released in 1986 by SST Records.

== Track listing ==
All tracks are written by Zoogz Rift.

Side one
| No. | Title | Length |
|---|---|---|
| 1. | "Rediscover Downtown Paterson" | 3:14 |
| 2. | "Island of Living Puke" | 2:49 |
| 3. | "A Very Pretty Song for a Very Special Young Lady" | 4:31 |
| 4. | "The Mo-Fo's Are After Me" | 3:28 |
| 5. | "Torture Sequence" | 0:56 |
| 6. | "You're Killing Me" | 2:00 |

Side two
| No. | Title | Length |
|---|---|---|
| 1. | "The Secret Marines (4-F, 5-0, 666, 7–11, 8-Is-Enough, 9-Lives, 10-4) Blow Out" | 3:07 |
| 2. | "Nightclub Sequence" | 2:22 |
| 3. | "Shiver Me Timbers" | 5:08 |
| 4. | "Escape from the Island of Living Puke" | 2:13 |
| 5. | "The Breather" | 4:20 |
| 6. | "I'm Happy" | 0:56 |

== Reception ==
Keyboard Magazine, in a special "experimental music" issue, described The Island of Living Puke as "moments of outstanding free-form rock, sandwiched between scrupulously obscene interruptions."

== Personnel ==
Adapted from the Island of Living Puke liner notes.

- Zoogz Rift – vocals, guitar, production

Musicians

- Scott Colby – slide guitar
- Alan Eugster – keyboards
- Richie Hass – drums
- Henry Kaiser – guitar (A5, B3, B4)
- Willie Lapin – bass guitar
- Ed O'Bryan – bass guitar

Musicians (cont.)

- Aaron Rift – piano (A1)
- Jonathan "Mako" Sharkey – clavinet
- Craig Unkrich – keyboards

Production and additional personnel

- Ethan James – engineering

== Release history ==
| Region | Date | Label | Format | Catalog |
|---|---|---|---|---|
| United States | 1986 | SST | LP | SST 077 |
