= Murdering Hell's Happy Cretins =

Studio album and Live album by Zoogz Rift
- Released: 1988
- Recorded: Various: De Effenaar; (Eindhoven, NL); Trigon Records Studios; (Los Angeles, CA)
- Genre: Experimental rock
- Length: 49:59
- Label: SST (211)
- Producer: Zoogz Rift

Zoogz Rift chronology
Nonentity (Water III: Fan Black Dada) (1988)	Murdering Hell's Happy Cretins (1988)	Torment (1989)

Professional ratings
Review scores
Source	Rating
Allmusic	4.5/5 stars

Murdering Hell's Happy Cretins is the tenth studio album by experimental rock composer Zoogz Rift, released in 1988 by SST Records.

== Track listing ==
All tracks are written by Zoogz Rift, except where noted.

Side one – Live in Holland
No.	Title	Writer(s)	Length
1.	"Story of a Soldier"	Ennio Morricone	0:51
2.	"Alienation"	John Trubee	3:39
3.	"Mongoloid Middle America"		4:12
4.	"Heart Attack"		2:12
5.	"With the Necessary Changes Having Been Made"		3:20
6.	"Look at the Fool" (Tim Buckley cover)	Tim Buckley	4:19
7.	"Sleazeball"		2:41
8.	"When My Ship Rolls In"	John Trubee	4:10

Side two – Dead in Los Angeles
No.	Title	Length
1.	"Puke Island Paradise"	3:00
2.	"Murdering Hell's Happy Cretins"	5:40
3.	"Tender Romance Sequence"	3:01
4.	"One of Us!"	7:47
5.	"A Equals A"	5:07

== Personnel ==
Adapted from the Murdering Hell's Happy Cretins liner notes.

- Zoogz Rift – vocals, guitar, production, illustrations

Musicians

- Tom Brown – drums (side Two)
- Richie Hass – drums (side One), vibraphone (side Two)
- Toby Holmes – trombone
- Rocky Howard – accordion
- Willie Lapin – bass guitar
- John Trubee – guitar (side One)

Production and additional personnel

- Pieter Bruegel – illustrations
- Theo Van Eenbergen – recording (A1-A8)
- John Golden – mastering
- Steve Greeno – photography
- Marc Mylar – recording (B1-B5)

== Release history ==
Region	Date	Label	Format	Catalog
United States	1988	SST	LP	SST 211
United States	1995	SST	CD	SST 211
