= War Zone: Music for Obnoxious Yuppie Scum =

Studio album by Zoogz Rift
- Released: March 31, 1990
- Recorded: January 1990
- Studio: Low-Tech Studios (Los Angeles, CA)
- Genre: Experimental rock
- Length: 39:15
- Label: Musical Tragedies
- Producer: Zoogz Rift

Zoogz Rift chronology
Torment (1989)	War Zone: Music for Obnoxious Yuppie Scum (1990)	Nutritionally Sound (1990)

Professional ratings
Review scores
Source	Rating
Allmusic	3/5 stars

War Zone: Music for Obnoxious Yuppie Scum is the twelfth studio album by experimental rock composer Zoogz Rift, released on March 31, 1990, by Musical Tragedies.

== Track listing ==
All tracks are written by Zoogz Rift, except "Heavy, Brother, Heavy" by Bob Russell and Bobby Scott.

Side one
No.	Title	Length
1.	"Kasaba Kabeza (Drop the Facades)"	19:36

Side two
No.	Title	Length
1.	"Bowl of Gregmar"	4:33
2.	"You Can Count on Us"	4:03
3.	"Heavy, Brother, Heavy" (Hollies cover)	5:54
4.	"War Zone"	5:09

== Personnel ==
Adapted from the War Zone: Music for Obnoxious Yuppie Scum liner notes.

- Zoogz Rift – lead vocals, guitar, production, cover art, design

Musicians

- Roch Bordenave – trombone
- Tom Brown – drums, percussion, additional vocals
- Willie Lapin – bass guitar, additional vocals
- Marc Mylar – tenor saxophone
- Jonathan "Mako" Sharkey – keyboards, additional vocals

Production and additional personnel

- Arthur Barrow – engineering

== Release history ==
Region	Date	Label	Format	Catalog
Germany	1990	Musical Tragedies	LP	MT-095
