= Halloween asteroid =

Halloween asteroid may refer to:

- Halloween asteroid (2015), asteroid 2015 TB145 that passed Earth on 2015-10-31
- Halloween asteroid (2028), asteroid (35396) 1997 XF11 that will pass Earth on 2028-10-26
- Halloween asteroid 2019 UN13 passed 6200 km above Earth's surface on 2019-10-31.

== See also ==
- Halloween (disambiguation)
