= The Greater Trumps =

1932 Christian fantasy novel by Charles Williams

- Author: Charles Williams
- Language: English
- Genre: Christian fantasy, supernatural thriller
- Publisher: Victor Gollancz Ltd
- Publication date: 1932
- Media type: Print (Hardback & Paperback)
- Pages: 268 (first edition)

The Greater Trumps is a 1932 supernatural thriller and Christian fantasy novel by the British author, poet, and theologian Charles Williams.

The original Tarot deck is used to unlock enormous metaphysical powers by allowing the possessors to see across space and time, create matter, and raise powerful natural storms.
