= Idiots on the Miniature Golf Course =

Studio album by Zoogz Rift
- Released: 1979
- Genre: Experimental rock
- Length: 43:16
- Label: Snout (original release); SST (123) (reissue)
- Producer: Zoogz Rift

Zoogz Rift chronology
Idiots on the Miniature Golf Course (1979)	Amputees in Limbo (1982)

Idiots on the Miniature Golf Course is the debut studio album of experimental rock composer Zoogz Rift, released in 1979 by Snout Records. It is dedicated to Don Van Vliet.

== Release and reception ==
Professional ratings
Review scores
Source	Rating
Allmusic	4.5/5 stars

Critics of the Trouser Press wrote that "this collection of private surrealistic humor, overambitiously complex writing and selfconsciously zany performances sets the tone for much of what was to follow."

== Track listing ==
Side one
No.	Title	Writer(s)	Length
1.	"Restrooms of Erotic Fantasies"		0:39
2.	"The Great Apes Ate Grapes"	Richie Hass	4:05
3.	"Lobotomy 4"		0:35
4.	"Feeling in My Bones"		3:13
5.	"The Night They All Came Out"	Richie Hass	3:13
6.	"Lazy Susan"		3:05
7.	"Ostriches Have Sex Too, You Know"		4:05
8.	"I Did So!"		1:27

Side two
No.	Title	Writer(s)	Length
1.	"Idiots on the Miniature Golf Course"		0:28
2.	"Golden Showers"	Richie Hass	2:37
3.	"Judge Bludge, The Hangin' Judge"	Richie Hass	1:34
4.	"Lobotomy 2"		0:37
5.	"The Rabbit and the Lady"		3:00
6.	"You Can Go Fuck Yourself"		2:12
7.	"Dinkle Dance"		4:59
8.	"We're All Born on Little Planets"		4:02
9.	"What Can We Feed to the Lions?"		3:25

== Personnel ==
Adapted from the Idiots on the Miniature Golf Course liner notes.

- Zoogz Rift – guitar, vocals, ARP 2600, production

Musicians

- Steve Bassel – guitar
- Richie Hass – drums, bass guitar, marimba, vibraphone
- Jonathan "Mako" Sharkey – piano
- Jim Simcoe – saxophone
- John Trubee – guitar
- Eric Williams – guitar, bass guitar, violin
- Mark Zimoski – drums

== Release history ==
Region	Date	Label	Format	Catalog
United States	1979	Snout	CS	ZRSI 20062
United States	1987	SST	CS, LP	SST 123
