= 7th Heaven season 2 =

7th Heaven
- Season 2
- DVD cover
- No. of episodes: 22

Release
- Original network: The WB
- Original release: September 15, 1997 – May 11, 1998

Season chronology
- ← Previous; Season 1 Next → Season 3

The second season of The WB American television drama series 7th Heaven premiered on September 15, 1997, and concluded on May 11, 1998, with a total of 22 episodes. Episode 3 introduces slight differences in the title sequence.

== Cast and characters ==
=== Main cast ===
- Stephen Collins as Eric Camden
- Catherine Hicks as Annie Camden
- Barry Watson as Matt Camden
- David Gallagher as Simon Camden
- Jessica Biel as Mary Camden
- Beverley Mitchell as Lucy Camden
- Mackenzie Rosman as Ruthie Camden
- Happy as Happy the Dog

== Episodes ==
No. overall	No. in season	Title	Directed by	Written by	Original release date	Prod. code	Viewers (millions)
23	1	"Don't Take My Love Away"	Burt Brinckerhoff	Brenda Hampton	September 15, 1997	01496022	4.63
Annie and Eric decide to renew their wedding vows on their upcoming 19th anniversary; Lucy broods over the fact that Jimmy is now dating her rival; Mary is sour about knee rehab and becoming distant with her boyfriend; Simon wants to move out of the room he shares with Ruthie; Eric does his best to offer closure to a murder victim's widow who wants to meet his killer.
24	2	"See You in September"	David Semel	Story by : Brenda Hampton; Teleplay by : Christopher Bird	September 22, 1997	01496023	4.77
Eric and Annie look forward to a quiet household now that all five kids are in school, but each experiences a trauma: Matt is caught wearing his father's pager; Mary gives Lucy an aspirin; Simon is suspended for unknowingly coming to school in possession of a butter knife; Ruthie's teacher finds fault when she refuses to take off her hat.
25	3	"I Love You"	Gabrielle Beaumont	Brenda Hampton	September 29, 1997	01496024	4.86
When Matt catches Simon and Ruthie snooping around in his private letters to his girlfriend Heather, he writes a trap letter stating that he and Heather eloped, but Eric finds it; when Simon and Ruthie tell Mary that Matt told Heather he loves her, she tries to get a similar declaration from Wilson; Annie invites Lucy's friend to spend the night after they witness the girl's mother yelling at her.
26	4	"Who Knew?"	Gabrielle Beaumont	Greg Plageman	October 6, 1997	01496025	5.49
Eric is absolutely positive he knows which of his kids owns the marijuana joint Happy brings into the house, but Annie warns him not to jump to conclusions. He forbids Mary and Lucy to have guests after supper, then changes his mind so he can question Lucy's new boyfriend Rod about drugs. Lucy finds a joint in Annie's dresser drawer, and she and Mary suspect their parents are "stoners"; and Annie reveals a secret about her past to Matt. Eric eventually confronts Matt, who admits that he brought it back but swears he had no intention of smoking it, but Eric isn't convinced and drives him out of the house, only to find him at the church confessing. Meanwhile, Ruthie's attempt to do her own laundry gives her a new wardrobe.
27	5	"Says Who?"	Harvey Laidman	Greg Plageman	October 13, 1997	01496026	5.60
Nosy neighbor Mrs. Bink (returning guest star Eileen Brennan) enlists Eric's aid in finding out why her best friend (guest star Peg Phillips) has suddenly moved into a retirement home; Simon and Ruthie embark on an experiment about the influence of cults; Lucy is alarmed by rumors that a classmate has an eating disorder.
28	6	"Breaking Up Is Hard to Do"	Harry Harris	Brenda Hampton	October 20, 1997	01496027	5.40
Mary splits up with longtime boyfriend Wilson; after receiving a "Dear John" letter from Heather, Matt begs his siblings for money for an immediate flight to Philadelphia to see her.
29	7	"Girls Just Want to Have Fun"	Joel J. Feigenbaum	Catherine LePard	November 3, 1997	01496028	5.97
Simon's friend Stan's sister is in a gang and gets brutally beaten when she tells them she wants to leave; Lucy dresses to look older and flirts with a 20-year-old mall-security guard.
30	8	"Do Something"	Tony Mordente	Naomi Janzen	November 10, 1997	01496029	5.42
Pointed remarks from Lucy and Mary about self-fulfillment prompt Annie to accept the local baker's offer to buy her homemade muffins; Matt's history of failed job attempts makes Eric reluctant to recommend him as a much-needed companion for parishioners' terminally-ill son.
31	9	"I Hate You"	Burt Brinckerhoff	Brenda Hampton & Eleah Horwitz	November 17, 1997	01496030	7.53
Matt's girlfriend Joanne dumps him when she overhears Mary and Lucy criticizing her "perfect" appearance during dinner at the Camdens'; Ruthie overreacts when Annie punishes her for practicing her artistic skills on her and Simon's bedroom wall; when a classmate says his father denies the Holocaust happened, Simon befriends a Holocaust survivor and invites her to speak to his history class.
32	10	"Truth or Dare"	Les Sheldon	Brenda Hampton & Eleah Horwitz	November 24, 1997	01496031	5.73
Eric is determined to lose a little weight after struggling to fit into an old pair of jeans; Mary is angry to discover that Matt paid a friend $20 to take her out; Lucy is thrilled that she and her friend Shelby have been invited to a popular girl's sleepover, but her ex's new girlfriend is also there.
33	11	"Lead, Follow, or Get Out of the Way"	Les Sheldon	Greg Plageman	January 12, 1998	01496032	6.15
Glenoak Community Church has the opportunity to have a Sunday service televised and the pressure of coming up with a 5-star sermon is taking its toll on Eric, who holes himself up in his study. Annie realizes she cannot handle everything on her own, including Simon's new career goal and Lucy failing a class. Eric's father "The Colonel" (returning guest-star Peter Graves hears of the chaos and comes from New York to restore order to the household with old-style military teamwork. But how will the big broadcast go over?
34	12	"Rush to Judgment"	Neema Barnette	Cristopher Bird	January 19, 1998	01496033	7.17
When $2500 suddenly disappears from the church treasury, Annie and Eric correctly suspect Lou Dalton (guest-star Alan Fudge), but people's opinions of the grouchy deacon soften when they learn that his wife urged him to steal the money to care for their autistic son; Mary's basketball coach acts inappropriately toward her.
35	13	"Stuck in the Middle with You"	Harry Harris	Brenda Hampton	January 26, 1998	01496034	6.25
Lucy's old boyfriend Jimmy Moon (guest star Matthew Linville) and new boyfriend Rod vie for her attention; Annie and Eric set a bad example for their marriage-counseling group.
36	14	"Red Tape"	Les Sheldon	Brenda Hampton	February 2, 1998	01496035	6.56
A mysterious personal ad in the school newspaper sends Matt more female admirers than he can handle; buy-one-get-one-free coupons give the Camdens a good reason to try out lunch at a new restaurant, but the coupons only cover the Blue Plate Special—liver and onions! Eric is intrigued by the attitude of Clarence, a young boy he meets at the local food bank; he tracks him down and discovers that his mother Harriet was their waitress, then becomes involved with the family's problems, which stem from her ex-husband's IRS trouble.
37	15	"Homecoming"	David J. Plenn	Catherine LePard	February 9, 1998	01496036	5.96
The only thing keeping Mary from getting back out on the basketball court after her knee surgery is the fear of failing in her comeback; to assure Ruthie that nothing bad will happen to her on her first school field trip to the museum, Annie offers to be one of the parent volunteers.
38	16	"It Takes a Village"	Burt Brinckerhoff	Sue Tenney	February 23, 1998	01496037	6.18
Simon and his buddy Nigel are thrilled--but apprehensive--when a popular classmate invites him to one of her favorite "make-out" parties; meanwhile, Lucy goes to the movies as a decoy so Nigel's grounded sister Keesha can sneak around with her boyfriend, who brings a friend for Lucy; Annie and Patricia unexpectedly crash the double date when they bring Ruthie and Lynn to the same theater and catch the teens making out.
39	17	"Nothing Endures But Change"	Stephen Collins	Heather Conkie	March 2, 1998	01496038	7.67
Lucy blackmails Matt into taking her to a restaurant to meet some friends, but on the way there, her friend gets in a fatal car accident. Mary's ex, Wilson (guest-star Andrew Keegan), needs a babysitter for his son in order to attend his senior prom; 6th-grader Simon would move into the attic to get away from Ruthie.
40	18	"My Kind of Guy"	Joseph B. Wallenstein	Greg Plageman	April 6, 1998	01496039	5.66
The Camdens invite French foreign-exchange student Guy into their home, but the suave, charming, worldly guest quickly wears out his welcome by finding a way to exasperate all five Camden children; Annie and Eric try to keep the romance in their busy lives by exchanging gushy messages in an online chat room.
41	19	"Time to Leave the Nest"	Tony Mordente	Stephanie Simpson	April 13, 1998	01496040	5.69
Glenoak organizes a search party when Simon brings home a disheveled young girl whose parents are nowhere to be found; feeling confined under his parents' roof in a small town, Matt contemplates going to college out-of-state.
42	20	"Like a Harlot"	Joel J. Feigenbaum	Sue Tenney	April 27, 1998	01496041	6.08
Mary and Lucy set themselves up for disastrous dates; Eric volunteers Matt to escort a friend's daughter to senior prom, unaware that she has the school's worst reputation; Ruthie is brokenhearted to learn the truth about her favorite costumed character, Snappy the Stegosaurus.
43	21	"Boyfriends…" (Part 1)	Burt Brinckerhoff	Brenda Hampton	May 4, 1998	01496042	6.18
Simon prepares Happy for a commercial, which is seen by the former owners from whom she ran away; Matt thinks Mary is having too much fun playing "mommy" to Wilson's young son Billy (twins Dylan and Casey Boersma), and the situation intensifies when the Camdens' pediatrician reports unexpected results in Mary's routine physical exam.
44	22	"…and Girlfriends" (Part 2)	Burt Brinckerhoff	Catherine LePard	May 11, 1998	01496043	9.33
Matt is graduating from high school as the valedictorian and planning to leave home two months earlier than expected and take an internship in Washington D.C. with First Lady Hillary Clinton; along with this, Annie and Eric deal with sobering news from their family doctor; and when the grandparents come to town for the graduation, the kids concoct a plan with The Colonel and Grandma Ruth to get Happy back from her former owners, and Annie's father shares news about him and Ginger.
