= Amputees in Limbo =

Studio album by Zoogz Rift
- Released: 1982
- Genre: Experimental rock
- Length: 44:01
- Label: Snout (original release); SST (122) (reissue)
- Producer: Zoogz Rift

Zoogz Rift chronology
Idiots on the Miniature Golf Course (1979)	Amputees in Limbo (1982)	Ipecac (1984)

Professional ratings
Review scores
Source	Rating
Allmusic	3/5 stars

Amputees in Limbo is the second studio album by Zoogz Rift, released in 1982 by Snout.

== Track listing ==
All tracks are written by Zoogz Rift.

Side one
No.	Title	Length
1.	"Heart Attack"	2:02
2.	"But the Picture Has a Mustache"	2:22
3.	"Moron Serenade"	3:47
4.	"Evil Eye"	7:15
5.	"Buffy & Jody"	1:34
6.	"My Daddy Works for the Secret Marines"	2:47
7.	"Searchin' for Clams Under the Glass Bottom Boat"	1:37

Side two
No.	Title	Length
1.	"Secret Marines – The Sequel"	8:49
2.	"Disintegration Waltz"	2:33
3.	"Eyes of Bodhidharma"	3:30
4.	"Art Band"	4:00
5.	"My Stuffed Animals Have Rabies"	3:45

== Personnel ==
Adapted from the Amputees in Limbo liner notes.

- Zoogz Rift – vocals, guitar, production, cover art, design

Musicians

- Danny Buchanan – bass guitar, photography
- M.B. Gordy – drums
- Richie Hass – drums, vibraphone
- Marc Mylar – soprano saxophone, synthesizer, engineering
- Jonathan "Mako" Sharkey – keyboards, synthesizer
- John Trubee – bass guitar, maracas

== Release history ==
Region	Date	Label	Format	Catalog
United States	1982	Snout	CS	
United Kingdom	1985	Cordelia	LP	Ericat 010
United States	1987	SST	CS, LP	SST 122
