= All Hallows' Eve (disambiguation) =

All Hallows' Eve, or Halloween, is a celebration observed in many countries on 31 October, the eve of the Western Christian feast of All Hallows' Day.

All Hallows' Eve may also refer to:

== Film and television ==
- All Hallows' Eve (2013 film), an American independent horror anthology film
  - All Hallows' Eve 2
- All Hallows' Eve (2016 film), a family Halloween film
- "All Hallows Eve", an episode of Suspense and adaptation of "Markheim" by Robert Louis Stevenson
- "All Hallows Eve", an episode of Blossom

== Music ==
- All Hallows Eve a 2004 EP by Evile
- "All Hallow’s Eve", a song by Bride from the 1989 album Silence Is Madness
- "All Hallow's Eve", a series of tracks by John Zorn from the 2013 album On the Torment of Saints, the Casting of Spells and the Evocation of Spirits
- "All Hallows Eve", a song by Type O Negative from the 1999 album World Coming Down
- All Hallows' Eve Track Pack, for Guitar Hero 5, 2009

== Other uses ==
- All Hallows’ Eve (novel), by Charles Williams, 1945
- All Hallow Eve, an 1860s stage play that starred Sophie Gimber Kuhn

== See also ==
- All Saints' Day
- All Hallows (disambiguation)
- Halloween (disambiguation)
