= Unhallowed (disambiguation) =

Unhallowed is a 2003 album by The Black Dahlia Murder, and its title track.

Unhallowed may also refer to:

- That which is not hallowed

== Music ==
- "Unhallowed", a song by Dissection from the 1995 album Storm of the Light's Bane
- "Unhallowed", a song by Rings of Saturn from the 2017 album Ultu Ulla
- "The Unhallowed", a song by Necrophobic from the 1999 album The Third Antichrist

== Other uses ==
- Unhallowed, a play by Gerard McLarnon
- Unhallowed, an unpublished game in the Dangerous Journeys series

== See also ==
- Unhallowed Ground (disambiguation)
- Hallow (disambiguation)
