= Nutritionally Sound =

Studio album by Marc Mylar and Zoogz Rift
- Released: 1990
- Genre: Experimental rock
- Length: 42:12
- Label: Trigon
- Producer: Zoogz Rift

Zoogz Rift chronology
War Zone (1990)	Nutritionally Sound (1990)	Villagers (1992)

Professional ratings
Review scores
Source	Rating
Allmusic	2/5 stars

Nutritionally Sound is a collaborative album by Marc Mylar and Zoogz Rift, released in 1990 by Trigon Records.

== Track listing ==
All tracks are written by Marc Mylar and Zoogz Rift.

No.	Title	Length
1.	"Take the 'A' Train"	0:28
2.	"Take the 'Z' Train"	0:58
3.	"Pearl Necklace"	5:22
4.	"Conditions for Employment"	3:12
5.	"All Bets Are Off"	3:24
6.	"Skeleton Protopunk Quagmire 10"	4:05
7.	"I'm Telling You Now"	2:04
8.	"Crazed Be the Lord"	9:07
9.	"You Are Being Watched"	3:25
10.	"Secret Marines—The Untold Story"	7:52
11.	"Get Up Offa That Thing"	2:15

== Personnel ==
Adapted from the Nutritionally Sound liner notes.

- Marc Mylar – tenor saxophone
- Zoogz Rift – lead vocals, guitar, production

== Release history ==
Region	Date	Label	Format	Catalog
United States	1990	Trigon	CD	TCD108
