= Unhallowed Ground (disambiguation) =

Unhallowed Ground may refer to:

- Unhallowed ground, ground that has not been hallowed, or consecrated
  - Unconsecrated parts of a cemetery
- Unhallowed Ground, a 2015 British independent horror film
- "Unhallowed Ground", a song by Midnight Syndicate from the 2002 album Vampyre

== See also ==
- Hallowed Ground (disambiguation)
- Unhallowed (disambiguation)
