= The Place of the Lion =

1931 book by Charles Williams

- First edition
- Author: Charles Williams
- Language: English
- Publication date: 1931

The Place of the Lion is a work of supernatural fiction written by Charles Williams. The book was first published in 1931 by Victor Gollancz.

== Summary ==
Platonic archetypes begin to manifest themselves outside a small Hertfordshire town, wreaking havoc and drawing to the surface the spiritual strengths and flaws of individual characters. Their focus is the home of Mr Berringer, the leader of a group interested in magical symbolism who falls into a coma after contact with the first archetype unleashed, the lion of the title. Other powers follow this one and cut off the town from the rest of the world that they will inevitably absorb and reshape. Among those overcome and destroyed by the raw powers they encounter are two members of the group, Mr Foster and Miss Wilmot, whose motivation is ultimately selfish. A chance visitor to the group, the academic author Damaris Tighe, narrowly escapes the same fate but is saved at the last moment by her cousin and fiancé, Anthony Durrant. She then sets out to locate Anthony's friend, Quentin Sabot, who had been with Anthony when the lion first appeared and has now fled into the countryside, overcome with terror.

Meanwhile, with the help of another group member, Mr Richardson, who also has the inner strength to withstand the angelical archetypes, Anthony is enabled to understand the process that has been unleashed by Berringer. Together they plan to counter it and reverse the threat. Its next phase has already started and some of the town's buildings begin to collapse as Berringer's house is swallowed in a column of unquenchable flame. Armed with the secret names of the archetypes from a grimoire, Anthony summons them back to their point of focus while Richardson neutralizes the fire by walking into it.

== Critical reception ==
T. S. Eliot described Williams' novels in this genre as "supernatural thrillers". C. S. Lewis had found the book inspirational and it is often cited as a major work that altered his own writings and helped him become a novelist. Anthony Boucher and J. Francis McComas, in their survey of fantasy fiction, called The Place of the Lion "one of the most daringly conceived and stunningly visualized of all Williams’ novels". Similarly, for Glen Cavaliero in his study of Williams' work, "plot, themes and literary treatment coalesce in an artistic unity that makes The Place of the Lion the most technically flawless of the novels, and thus a more satifyingly integrated fable than its predecessors". Over the years the novel has been the subject of a number of other academic studies.
