= Descent into Hell (novel) =

1937 novel written by Charles Williams

Descent Into Hell
- First hardcover edition
- Author: Charles Williams
- Publisher: Faber and Faber
- Publication date: 1937
- Pages: 222

Descent Into Hell is a 1937 novel written by Charles Williams.

== Overview ==
Williams is less well known than his fellow Inklings, such as C. S. Lewis and J. R. R. Tolkien. Like some of them, however, he wrote a series of novels which combine elements of fantasy fiction and Christian symbolism. Forgoing the detective fiction style of most of his earlier supernatural novels, most of the story's action is spiritual or psychological in nature. It fits the "theological thriller" description sometimes given to his works. For this reason Descent was initially rejected by publishers, though T. S. Eliot's publishing house Faber and Faber would eventually pick up the novel, as Eliot admired Williams's work, and, though he did not like Descent Into Hell as well as the earlier novels, desired to see it printed.

== Allusions ==
There are several prominent literary allusions running throughout Descent Into Hell. Battle Hill's resident poet, Peter Stanhope, frequently quotes and references William Shakespeare's play The Tempest.

Percy Bysshe Shelley's work Prometheus Unbound is also referenced repeatedly, regarding the appearance of a doppelgänger.

Less obvious Biblical allusions are present, as well as several references to mythology and legend, including Lilith, Samael, and succubi.

== Summary ==
The action takes place in Battle Hill, outside London, amidst the townspeople's staging of a new play by Peter Stanhope. The hill seems to reside at the crux of time, as characters from the past appear, and perhaps at a doorway to the beyond, as characters are alternately summoned Heavenwards or descend into Hell.

Pauline Anstruther, the heroine of the novel, lives in fear of meeting her own doppelgänger, which has appeared to her throughout her life. But Stanhope, in an action central to the author's own theology, takes the burden of her fears upon himself—Williams called this the Doctrine of Substituted Love—and enables Pauline, at long last, to face her true self. Williams drew this idea from the biblical verse, "Ye shall bear one another's burdens".

And so, Stanhope does take the weight, with no surreptitious motive, in the most affecting scene in the novel, and Pauline, liberated, is able to accept truth.

On the other hand, Lawrence Wentworth, a local historian, suffers unrequited love for the young Adela Hunt. Frustrated and self-deluded, he creates a physical phantasm of Adela begins a relationship with it. This unlawful self-love leads to more and more isolation and alienation from Battle Hill. Unlike the suicide from earlier chapters, who finds redemption, Wentworth even while alive begins the descent into Hell.
