= Halloween: Monster Mix =

Studio album by Mannheim Steamroller
- Released: September 21, 2004
- Genre: New age
- Length: 40:28
- Label: American Gramaphone
- Producer: Chip Davis

Mannheim Steamroller chronology
Halloween (2003)	Halloween: Monster Mix (2004)	Christmas Celebration (2004)

Mannheim Steamroller Halloween albums chronology
Halloween (2003)	Halloween: Monster Mix (2004)	Halloween 2: Creatures Collection (2006)

Professional ratings
Review scores
Source	Rating
Allmusic	4/5 stars

Halloween: Monster Mix is a Halloween album by American band, Mannheim Steamroller. It contains mostly tracks from their previous Halloween collection, Halloween, plus three new tracks ("Night Ambience", "Full Moon" & "Enchanted Forest IV"). The tracks also feature new arrangements, and are also shorter in length.

== Track listing ==
All tracks are written by Chip Davis, except where noted.

No.	Title	Writer(s)	Length
1.	"The Sorcerer's Apprentice"	Paul Dukas	4:46
2.	"Enchanted Forest"		2:11
3.	"Hall of the Mountain King"	Edvard Grieg	2:47
4.	"The Other Side"		2:32
5.	"Harvest Dance"		2:56
6.	"Enchanted Forest II"		1:45
7.	"The Reaper"		0:50
8.	"Night on Bald Mountain"	Modest Mussorgsky	4:12
9.	"Ghost Voices"		0:35
10.	"Enchanted Forest III"		1:33
11.	"Crystal"		4:16
12.	"Mountain King"		2:00
13.	"Night Ambience"		0:52
14.	"Full Moon"		3:10
15.	"Enchanted Forest IV"		2:19
16.	"The Flying Dutchman"	Richard Wagner	3:33
Total length:			89:43
