= Zoogz Rift =

American musician, painter and professional wrestling personality (1953 – 2011)

Background information
- Also known as: The Liquid Moamo (pronounced mo-ah-mo)
- Born: Robert Pawlikowski; July 10, 1953
- Origin: Paterson, New Jersey, U.S.
- Died: March 22, 2011 (aged 57)
- Genres: Experimental rock; art rock; post-punk; avant-prog
- Occupations: Musician, composer, painter, pro wrestling entertainer
- Instrument: Guitar
- Years active: 1972–2006
- Label: SST Records
- Spouse: Laura Bonanno (ex-wife)
- Website: zoogzrift.4mg.com

Zoogz Rift (born Robert Pawlikowski; July 10, 1953 – March 22, 2011) was an American musician, painter and professional wrestling personality.

Born Robert Pawlikowski in Paterson, New Jersey, Rift was raised in Parsippany-Troy Hills, New Jersey and moved to Los Angeles while in his mid-20s.

== Biography ==
=== Musical career ===
The Trouser Press describes Zoogz Rift as "an iconoclastic original" who is "as imaginative and stimulating as he is irritating and vitriolic." Rift was influenced by Frank Zappa and Captain Beefheart as well as Salvador Dalí and Ayn Rand. Zoogz Rift began his recording career with the album Idiots on the Miniature Golf Course, released by Snout Records in 1979. His long-time collaborators included Richie Häss and John Trubee (the latter being famous for the songshark tune, "A Blind Man's Penis"). Rift released several albums through SST Records during the 1980s. Richard Gehr, writing for Spin, noted that by the time of 1985's Interim Resurgence, Rift had completed a transition from "Zappa sycophancy" to "a conceptual continuity of his very own." Keyboard Magazine, in a special "Experimental Music" issue, described Rift's album The Island of Living Puke as "moments of outstanding free-form rock, sandwiched between scrupulously obscene interruptions."

=== Wrestling career ===
By 1985, Zoogz Rift had indicated his plans to enter professional wrestling. Zoogz Rift booked the UWF (Universal Wrestling Federation) in 1993. He left the promotion in March 1994, but returned in May 1995 to become Vice-President, alongside founder Herb Abrams. After Abrams died in 1996, the UWF promotion closed and Zoogz was left without a job. Zoogz hosted an online wrestling show, entitled Puke-A-Mania that provided a weekly assessment of WWE and TNA promotions, with Zoogz giving insight on wrestling issues. His rants on the show included the pushing of former WWF superstar Warlord, and his fascination with possibly training 60-year-old Vince McMahon to become a main-event wrestler. Zoogz' wrestling career was cut short after being torture racked by Lex Luger.

=== Death ===
Zoogz Rift died on March 22, 2011, aged 57, due to complications from diabetes.

== Discography ==
Studio albums

- Idiots on the Miniature Golf Course (1979)
- Amputees in Limbo (1982)
- Ipecac (1984)
- Interim Resurgence (1985)
- Island of Living Puke (1986)
- Water (1987)
- Water II: At Safe Distance (1987)
- Son of Puke (1987)
- Nonentity (Water III: Fan Black Dada) (1988)
- Murdering Hell's Happy Cretins (1988)
- Torment (1989)
- War Zone (1990)
- Nutritionally Sound (1990)
- Villagers (1992)
- Five Billion Pinheads Can't Be Wrong (1996)
- Sanitized For Your Protection (1998)
- School of the Criminally Insane (1999)
- Born in the Wrong Universe (2001)

Compilation albums

- Kiss My Bleeding Dork (1984)
- Looser Than Clams... A Historical Retrospective (Greatest Hits, Vol. 1) (1986)
- This Is the Music Your Parents Warned You About, Vol. 1 (1995)
- This Is the Music Your Parents Warned You About, Vol. 2 (1995)
- This Is the Music Your Parents Warned You About, Vol. 3 (1996)
- Sunken Treasures: The Very Best of Zoogz Rift (2000)
- Demons Are Stabbing Me With Pitchforks (2000)
- Dada Is Surrealism With a Sinister Agenda (2002)

Cassette albums

- With No Apparent Reason (1976)
- Music Sucks (1982)
- Can You Smell My Genitals From Where You're Standing? (1983)
- None of Your Damn Business! (1983)
- The Diseased Confessions of Moamo Milkman (1984)
