= Five Billion Pinheads Can't Be Wrong =

Studio album by Zoogz Rift
- Released: 1996
- Recorded: Fall 1996
- Studio: Lotek Studio (Los Angeles, CA)
- Genre: Experimental rock
- Length: 61:41
- Label: AVT

Zoogz Rift chronology
Villagers (1992)	Five Billion Pinheads Can't Be Wrong (1996)

Professional ratings
Review scores
Source	Rating
Allmusic	3/5 stars

Five Billion Pinheads Can't Be Wrong is the fourteenth studio album by experimental rock composer Zoogz Rift, released in 1996 by AVT Records.

== Track listing ==
All tracks are written by Zoogz Rift.

No.	Title	Length
1.	"Contradictions"	10:34
2.	"I Work on the Retard Farm"	4:32
3.	"Ill-Conceived"	5:34
4.	"Triumph of the Won't"	4:52
5.	"Comprachico Boogie"	4:45
6.	"Psychoaquatic Demons"	8:43
7.	"Dissemblers"	12:23
8.	"Oasis"	3:00
9.	"Fin"	7:18

== Personnel ==
Adapted from the Five Billion Pinheads Can't Be Wrong liner notes.

- Zoogz Rift – lead vocals, guitar, bass guitar, synthesizer, production

Musicians

- Tom Brown – percussion
- Aaron Rift – alto saxophone, keyboards, additional vocals
- Terry Saunders – additional vocals
- Robert Arthur Williams – drums

== Release history ==
Region	Date	Label	Format	Catalog
United States	1996	AVT	CD	002
