= Son of Puke =

Studio album by Zoogz Rift
- Released: September 1987
- Recorded: 1972 – 1987
- Genre: Experimental rock
- Length: 45:00
- Label: SST (174)
- Producer: Zoogz Rift

Zoogz Rift chronology
Water II: At Safe Distance (1987)	Son of Puke (1987)	Nonentity (Water III: Fan Black Dada) (1988)

Professional ratings
Review scores
Source	Rating
Allmusic	2/5 stars

Son of Puke is the eighth studio album by Zoogz Rift, released in September 1987 by SST Records. Side one contains tape manipulations of music that had been previously recorded by Rift's band. The second side contains a discarded musical recording by The Transients. Rift discovered the recording and liked it so much that he decided it deserved to be officially released. It is the only known recording by the group.

== Track listing ==
All tracks are written by Zoogz Rift.

Side one
No.	Title	Length
1.	"Son of Puke"

Side two
No.	Title	Length
1.	"The Transients"

== Personnel ==
Adapted from the Son of Puke liner notes.

- Zoogz Rift – vocals, guitar, ARP 2600 synthesizer, Casio VL-1 synthesizer, tape, production

== Release history ==
Region	Date	Label	Format	Catalog
United States	1987	SST	CS	SST 174
