= 7th Heaven season 3 =

7th Heaven
- Season 3
- DVD cover
- No. of episodes: 22

Release
- Original network: The WB
- Original release: September 21, 1998 – May 24, 1999

Season chronology
- ← Previous; Season 2 Next → Season 4

The third season of 7th Heaven—an American family-drama television series, created and produced by Brenda Hampton—premiered on September 21, 1998, on The WB, and concluded on May 24, 1999 (22 episodes).

== Cast and characters ==
=== Main ===
- Stephen Collins as Eric Camden
- Catherine Hicks as Annie Camden
- Barry Watson as Matt Camden
- David Gallagher as Simon Camden
- Jessica Biel as Mary Camden
- Beverley Mitchell as Lucy Camden
- Mackenzie Rosman as Ruthie Camden
- Happy as Happy the Dog

Note: Nikolas and Lorenzo Brino portray Sam and David Camden (episodes 14–22), but are uncredited until season 6.

== Episodes ==
No. overall	No. in season	Title	Directed by	Written by	Original release date	Prod. code	Viewers (millions)
45	1	"It Takes Two, Baby"	Burt Brinckerhoff	Brenda Hampton	September 21, 1998	04298044	6.29
Annie is pregnant with twins, but jealous Ruthie has the morning sickness; Mary and Lucy engage in a flirting contest when Mary doubts the validity of popular dating handbook The Rules. Matt started his first year of college and decided to move out of the house and moves in with three girls in an apartment.
46	2	"Drunk Like Me"	Joel J. Feigenbaum	Carol Evan McKeand & Nigel McKeand	September 28, 1998	04298045	6.49
College-freshman Matt reconsiders pledging a fraternity when his friend goes through an initiation involving an episode of binge drinking; current "man of the house" wants no part of helping the family restore a car as a gift for Matt; a divorcee flirts with Eric.
47	3	"Cutters"	Anson Williams	Sue Tenney	October 5, 1998	04298047	7.55
Mary thinks Lucy's friend Nicole (Allison Mack) is partially responsible for Lucy's sinking biology grade, then later she catches her cutting herself in the bathroom; Simon pays Ruthie to do well on a test.
48	4	"The Legacy"	Tony Mordente	Catherine LePard	October 12, 1998	04298046	6.73
After Simon witnesses his science teacher Mr. Lane intervening between a young boy and his screaming father, he feels guilty for getting Mr. Lane fired and asks Eric for help; Matt gets the wrong idea from his English professor Dr. LaRoe; Mary is one of three Lady Wildcats who must sit out the season's first basketball game when they cut class.
49	5	"... And a Nice Chianti"	Harvey S. Laidman	Greg Plageman	October 19, 1998	04298048	6.10
A freshman with a girlfriend courts Lucy; Simon goes from geek to hero and back; Eric helps grieving parishioner Elizabeth Brown find the recipients of her son's organs on the 3-year anniversary of his death; Matt is mistaken for a grand theft auto suspect when he pulls over to help a pregnant girl.
50	6	"And the Home of the Brave"	Harry Harris	Brenda Hampton	November 2, 1998	04298049	6.67
On Veterans Day, a hormonal Annie refuses to prepare the wedding reception of her father Charles (Graham Jarvis) and his girlfriend Ginger (Beverly Garland); at the market she stops the harassment of a homeless veteran (Ray Walston), a former chef who offers to help her with the reception to show his gratitude; Matt and Mary take a seemingly endless road trip; Ruthie reunites with her imaginary friend.
51	7	"Johnny Get Your Gun"	Kevin Inch	Brenda Hampton	November 9, 1998	04298050	9.13
Deena's (Nicole Cherie Saletta) ex Johnny shows up at school and threatens to shoot Simon, and when Eric intervenes, Johnny shoots him; he is later deemed violently insane and sentenced to a mental institution for youth. Mary dates Matt's girlfriend's psychopathic brother against Matt's orders.
52	8	"No Sex, Some Drugs and a Little Rock 'n' Roll"	David J. Plenn	Sue Tenney	November 16, 1998	04298051	8.24
Eric's former rock and roll band comes to town for a concert, but he is concerned about their possible drug habits, and Annie's displeased about their influence on the kids; Mary's friend pressures her to take herbal energy pills; Lucy agonizes over being temporarily banned from using the phone.
53	9	"Let's Talk About Sex"	Tony Mordente	Brenda Hampton	November 23, 1998	04298052	8.19
Eric and Annie accidentally attend a prenatal class for first-time parents and end up counseling pregnant teens Barbara and Cassandra and their teenage boyfriends on preparing for parenthood; Matt thinks he is losing his brotherly touch when he does not foresee Lucy's plans to have sex with Jordan; Mary sneaks off to a co-ed sleepover; Simon practices his babysitting skills on formidable opponent Ruthie.
54	10	"Here Comes Santa Claus"	Joel J. Feigenbaum	Chris Olsen & Jeff Olsen	December 14, 1998	04298053	8.52
Eric tries to instill the real meaning of Christmas into his children by assigning the three eldest to do charity work; he and Annie get creative with their gift-giving; Simon works to restore Ruthie's holiday spirit after her encounter with an unexpectedly familiar mall Santa Claus; Mary meets a new man (Carlos Ponce) at the soup kitchen and brings him home for a Camden Christmas; Lucy receives a confusing present from Jordan.
55	11	"Nobody Knows..."	Harry Harris	Brenda Hampton & Catherine LePard	January 11, 1999	04298054	7.42
Simon learns that his girlfriend Deena is a leukemia survivor and Ruthie tries to calm his fears by calling "Mabel the Psychic" (Phyllis Diller); Mary employs an unusual tactic to get her driver's license; only Matt knows that Aunt Julie (Deborah Raffin) is back in town.
56	12	"All That Jazz"	Harvey Laidman	Sue Tenney	January 18, 1999	04298055	7.94
Simon wants to buy Deena the perfect gift for their 3-month anniversary, but it consumes his time, which annoys his friend Nigel; Lucy's ex-boyfriend hides in her closet after his mom's death; Heather is back in town and tells Matt she's engaged; Dr. Hastings, who almost botched Matt's birth, now works at Glenoak Hospital and Annie doesn't want him to deliver her twins; Mary hears from an unexpected, unwelcome caller.
57	13	"The Tribes That Bind"	Bradley Gross	Catherine LePard	January 25, 1999	04298056	9.48
While Lucy is on a weekend trip exploring her inner self, the church's women's group throws Annie a baby shower and snoops around the house; Matt and Eric witness racism while out to lunch with friends; Ruthie involves her siblings in her playground war with a schoolmate.
58	14	"In Praise of Women"	Burt Brinckerhoff	Brenda Hampton & Sue Tenney	February 8, 1999	04298057	12.51
The twins are on their way and the older kids must find ways to entertain themselves as Annie goes through her most difficult labor yet. Lucy questions her true feelings for Jordan and wonders if she should end their relationship; Matt musters the courage to give blood; Simon prays for baby brothers; and Happy has a blast in the empty house.
59	15	"It Happened One Night"	Tony Mordente	Brenda Hampton & Greg Plageman	February 15, 1999	04298058	10.65
Samuel and David are home and will not stop crying; Matt starts working at the Dairy Shack as a delivery guy; Mary sneaks out to meet Wilson at the pool hall--and sees Jordan there and talks to him--and Lucy, covering for her, ends up doing all the cleaning by herself; Ruthie wants to run away from home and Annie comforts her by giving her her baby book; Matt gets fired but sees his old girlfriend Shana.
60	16	"Paranoia"	Stephen Collins	Ron Darian	February 22, 1999	04298059	10.30
The whole family tries to convince Lucy not to see Jimmy Moon anymore when Eric has reason to believe he's using drugs; Lucy is overwhelmed when she doesn't listen to them and tries to help him on her own; not-so-athletic Simon hopes to use basketball-star Mary as a reference when he tries out for the baseball team.
61	17	"Sometimes That's Just the Way It Is"	Kevin Inch	Linda Ptolemy	March 1, 1999	04298060	10.01
Eric counsels Ted and Emily, a troubled couple on the brink of divorce; Matt decides to join the Army without consulting his parents; Mary and Lucy are just trying to get out of the house when they are in a car accident with drunk-driving Ted; Simon searches for his red-lightning ring and tries sending chain letters to banish bad luck as the family's new middle sibling; Ruthie tries to focus visitors' attention on herself instead of the new babies they're coming to meet.
62	18	"We the People"	Harry Harris	Catherine LePard	March 15, 1999	04298061	9.93
Moral outrage explodes in the community over an affair between a college president and a student at Matt's college, and even Matt gets into a fight over a difference of opinions about the affair; Simon and Ruthie get an after-school job; Mary thinks she hit a car in the school parking lot and makes amends by promising the driver a date with Lucy.
63	19	"The Voice"	David J. Plenn	Ron Darian	May 3, 1999	04298062	7.19
Eric defends Rudy, a custodian at Simon's school, when the school board forces him into early retirement because he claims to hear messages from God; when Annie wants a fun night out with other mothers, Mary volunteers herself and Lucy to look after the twins but expects Lucy to do most of the work; nobody believes Ruthie when she says a chimp is living in a tree in the backyard.
64	20	"All Dogs Go to Heaven"	Paul Snider	Chris Olsen & Jeff Olsen	May 10, 1999	04298063	7.50
Two parishioners entreat Eric to take their suffering dog to the vet to be put down; Matt catches Mary kissing Michael Towner in Sergeant Michaels' squad car; Simon goes on his first date with Deena, bringing Lucy along for Deena's brother.
65	21	"There Goes the Bride: Part 1"	Burt Brinckerhoff	Teleplay by : Brenda Hampton & Sue Tenney; Story by : Sue Tenney	May 17, 1999	04298064	8.33
Eric worries about Matt as Heather's wedding approaches; he also learns – and keeps from the family – that his sister Julie is dating Dr. Hastings; Deena's cousin kisses Simon and Lucy's ex Jordan admits he likes Mary; Ruthie wants to be a bridesmaid in Heather's wedding. To be continued...
66	22	"There Goes the Bride: Part 2"	Burt Brinckerhoff	Teleplay by : Brenda Hampton & Sue Tenney; Story by : Sue Tenney	May 24, 1999	04298065	9.60
Eric counsels an engaged couple facing difficulties; Mary, Lucy and Simon learn the repercussions of forbidden love, especially Simon when Ruthie catches him and Deena kissing in his bedroom and threatens to tell on them; Julie marries Dr. Hastings (Hank) and learns that she is pregnant; Heather breaks up with her fiancé when she learns he was cheating on her, and Matt tries to save his relationship with Shana after running off with Heather.
