= Interim Resurgence =

Studio album by Zoogz Rift
- Released: 1985
- Recorded: June – July 1985
- Studio: Trigon Studios (Los Angeles, CA)
- Genre: Experimental rock
- Length: 36:00
- Label: Snout (original release); SST (121) (reissue)
- Producer: Zoogz Rift

Zoogz Rift chronology
| Ipecac (1984) | Interim Resurgence (1985) | Island of Living Puke (1986) |

Professional ratings
Review scores
| Source | Rating |
|---|---|
| Allmusic | 2/5 stars |

Interim Resurgence is the fourth studio album by Zoogz Rift, released in 1985 by Snout Records.

== Reception ==
Spin said the album was, "almost, dare I say it, "conceptual" in scope, alternating brilliant songs (you know, with words) and instrumental interludes (Rift knows what he needs from his loyal musician friends."

== Track listing ==
All tracks are written by Zoogz Rift.

Side one
| No. | Title | Length |
|---|---|---|
| 1. | "Pre-Moamo Syndrome" | 1:33 |
| 2. | "With the Necessary Changes Having Been Made" | 3:08 |
| 3. | "Night Traffic" | 3:55 |
| 4. | "Exquisite Corpse" | 4:06 |
| 5. | "Don't Go Outside" | 4:00 |
| 6. | "X-Ray Girls" | 4:16 |

Side two
| No. | Title | Length |
|---|---|---|
| 1. | "Imaginary Numbers" | 5:09 |
| 2. | "Mutatis Mutandis" | 6:39 |
| 3. | "Ironic Woodwind Interlude" | 2:45 |
| 4. | "Spit in the Fog" | 6:00 |

== Personnel ==
Adapted from the Ipecac liner notes.

- Zoogz Rift – vocals (A2-A4, A6, B2, B4), guitar (A1, A2, A5, B2), drum machine (A1), arrangement, conductor, production

Musicians

- Scott Colby – voice (A3)
- Tom Ferranti – drums (A2, A4, B2, B4)
- M.B. Gordy – drums (A6)
- Owen Green – bass guitar (A2, A4, B2, B4)
- Richie Hass – marimba (A6, B2, B4)
- Matt Karlsen – voice (A3)

Musicians (cont.)

- Marc Mylar – tenor saxophone (B2, B4), clarinet (B3), engineering
- Ed O'Bryan – voice (A3)
- Jonathan "Mako" Sharkey – voice (A3)
- John Trubee – voice (A3)
- Craig Unkrich – synthesizer (A2, A4, B2, B4), piano (B1), arrangement (B1)

== Release history ==
| Region | Date | Label | Format | Catalog |
|---|---|---|---|---|
| United States | 1985 | Snout | LP | SRR-016 |
| United States | 1987 | SST | LP | SST 121 |
