= Torment (Zoogz Rift album) =

Studio album by Zoogz Rift
- Released: December 1989
- Genre: Experimental rock
- Length: 38:01
- Label: SST (251)
- Producer: Zoogz Rift

Zoogz Rift chronology
Murdering Hell's Happy Cretins (1988)	Torment (1989)	War Zone: Music for Obnoxious Yuppie Scum (1990)

Professional ratings
Review scores
Source	Rating
Allmusic	3/5 stars

Torment is the eleventh studio album by experimental rock composer Zoogz Rift, released in December 1989 by SST Records.

== Track listing ==
All tracks are written by Zoogz Rift, except "Sweet Surrender" by Tim Buckley.

Side one
No.	Title	Length
1.	"Hi Mom I'm Home"	4:36
2.	"Torment"	2:32
3.	"Dead Planet Earth"	3:47
4.	"Naked on the Mountain (Looking at the Sea)"	3:27
5.	"The Secret Marines Sex Kitten Beach Party"	3:51
6.	"This Town Sucks"	1:59

Side two
No.	Title	Length
1.	"United We Fall"	1:00
2.	"Sweet Surrender" (Tim Buckley cover)	6:55
3.	"Meet Me at Stinky's"	1:53
4.	"Defecation Rainbow"	1:40
5.	"Bad Risk"	2:29
6.	"Popcorn Scumbago"	3:44

CD issue bonus tracks
No.	Title	Writer(s)	Length
13.	"Candy Girl" (The Four Seasons cover)	Larry Santos	2:30
14.	"Medley" (Peripheral Darkness/Boogie Woogie Waltz)		14:32
15.	"Low Life"		2:24
16.	"Let a Man Come in and Eat the Popcorn Parts 47 and 93"		8:16
17.	"Sweet Surrender #2" (Tim Buckley cover)	Tim Buckley	6:13
18.	"Let a Man Come in and Eat the Popcorn"		2:04

== Personnel ==
Adapted from the Torment liner notes.

- Zoogz Rift – vocals, guitar, percussion

Musicians

- Tom Brown – drums, percussion, additional vocals
- Richie Hass – vibraphone
- Willie Lapin – bass guitar, percussion, additional vocals
- Marc Mylar – clarinet, tenor saxophone
- Jonathan "Mako" Sharkey – synthesizer, percussion, additional vocals

Production and additional personnel

- John Golden – mastering

== Release history ==
Region	Date	Label	Format	Catalog
United States	1989	SST	LP	SST 251
United States	1994	SST	CD	SST 251
