= Halloween II =

Halloween II may refer to:

- Halloween II (1981 film), the first sequel to Halloween (1978)
  - Halloween II (1981 soundtrack), the soundtrack to the 1981 film
- Halloween II (2009 film), the sequel to Halloween (2007)
  - Halloween II (2009 soundtrack), the soundtrack to the 2009 film
- "Halloween II" (Brooklyn Nine-Nine), 4th episode 2nd season
- "Halloween II", a song by The Misfits from the 1981 "Halloween" single
- "Halloween II", a song by Samhain from the 1986 album Samhain III: November-Coming-Fire
- Halloween II: The Blackest Eyes, a 2001 comic book written by Phil Nutman from Chaos! Comics

== See also ==
- Halloween (2018 film), a direct sequel to the 1978 film Halloween also called "Halloween II 3" during production
- Halloween (franchise), the media franchise spawned from the 1978 film
- Halloween (disambiguation)
