= Hallowed Ground =

Hallowed Ground may refer to:

- Hallowed ground, ground which has been hallowed, or consecrated
  - Cemetery which has been consecrated

== Music ==
- Hallowed Ground (Violent Femmes album) or the title track
- Hallowed Ground (Skin Yard album) or the title track
- “Hallowed Ground”, by the Alarm from Eye of the Hurricane
- “Hallowed Ground”, by Erasure from The Innocents
- “Hallowed Ground”, by Jude Cole from A View from 3rd Street
- “Hallowed Ground”, by W.A.S.P. from Dying for the World
- “Hallowed Ground”, by Biohazard from Kill or Be Killed
- “Hallowed Ground”, by How to Destroy Angels from Welcome Oblivion
- “Hallowed Ground”, by Bishop Briggs from Church of Scars

== Other uses ==
- Hallowed Ground (film), a 2007 horror film directed by David Benullo
- Gettysburg National Cemetery, referred to as "this hallowed ground" in the Gettysburg Address
- Hallowed Ground, a magazine published by the American Battlefield Trust

== See also ==
- On Hallowed Ground (book) AD&D RPG manual
- Unhallowed Ground (disambiguation)
- Hallow (disambiguation)
