= Charles Williams (British writer) =

British writer, theologian, and literary critic (1886-1945)

- Born: Charles Walter Stansby Williams; 20 September 1886; London, England
- Died: 15 May 1945 (aged 58); Oxford, England
- Occupations: Editor, novelist
- Spouse: Florence Conway
- Writing career
- Genre: Fantasy
- Notable works: War in Heaven; The Place of the Lion; The Greater Trumps; Descent into Hell

Charles Walter Stansby Williams (20 September 1886 – 15 May 1945) was an English poet, novelist, playwright, theologian and literary critic. Most of his life was spent in London, where he was born, but in 1939 he moved to Oxford with the university press for which he worked until his death.

== Biography ==
Charles Williams was born in London in 1886, the only son of (Richard) Walter Stansby Williams (1848–1929) and Mary (née Wall). His father Walter was a journalist and foreign business correspondent for an importing firm, writing in French and German, who was a 'regular and valued' contributor of verse, stories and articles to many popular magazines. His mother Mary, the sister of the ecclesiologist and historian J. Charles Wall, was a former milliner (hatmaker), of Islington. He had one sister, Edith, born in 1889. The Williams family lived in 'shabby-genteel' circumstances, owing to Walter's increasing blindness and the decline of the firm by which he was employed, in Holloway. In 1894 the family moved to St Albans in Hertfordshire, where Williams lived until his marriage in 1917.

Educated at St Albans School, Williams was awarded a scholarship to University College London, but he left in 1904 without a degree, as he could not pay the tuition fees.

Williams began work in 1904 in a Methodist bookroom. He was employed by the Oxford University Press (OUP) as a proofreading assistant in 1908 and quickly climbed to the position of editor. He continued to work at the OUP in various positions of increasing responsibility until his death in 1945. One of his greatest editorial achievements was the publication of the first major English-language edition of the works of Søren Kierkegaard. His work was part of the literature event in the art competition at the 1924 Summer Olympics.

Although chiefly remembered as a novelist, Williams also published poetry, works of literary criticism, theology, drama, history, biography, and a voluminous number of book reviews. Some of his best-known novels are War in Heaven (1930), Descent into Hell (1937), and All Hallows' Eve (1945). T. S. Eliot, who wrote an introduction for the last of these, described Williams's novels as "supernatural thrillers" because they explore the sacramental intersection of the physical with the spiritual while also examining the ways in which power, even spiritual power, can corrupt as well as sanctify.

All of Williams's fantasies, unlike those of J. R. R. Tolkien and most of those of C. S. Lewis, are set in the contemporary world. Williams has been described by Colin Manlove as one of the three main writers of "Christian fantasy" in the twentieth century (the other two being C. S. Lewis and T. F. Powys). Some writers of fantasy novels with contemporary settings, notably Tim Powers, cite Williams as their inspiration.

W. H. Auden, one of Williams's greatest admirers, reportedly re-read Williams's extraordinary and highly unconventional history of the church, The Descent of the Dove (1939), every year. Williams's study of Dante entitled The Figure of Beatrice (1944) was very highly regarded at its time of publication and continues to be consulted by Dante scholars today. His work inspired Dorothy L. Sayers to undertake her translation of The Divine Comedy. Williams, however, regarded his most important work to be his extremely dense and complex Arthurian poetry, of which two books were published, Taliessin through Logres (1938) and The Region of the Summer Stars (1944), and more remained unfinished at his death. Some of Williams's essays were collected and published posthumously in Image of the City and Other Essays (1958), edited by Anne Ridler.

Williams gathered many followers and disciples during his lifetime. He was, for a period, a member of the Salvator Mundi Temple of the Fellowship of the Rosy Cross. He met fellow Anglican Evelyn Underhill in 1937 and later wrote the introduction to her published Letters in 1943.

When World War II broke out in 1939, Oxford University Press moved its offices from London to Oxford. Williams was reluctant to leave his beloved city, and his wife Florence refused to go. From the nearly 700 letters he wrote to his wife during the war years, a generous selection has been published – "primarily ... love letters," the editor calls them.

The move to Oxford did allow him to participate regularly in Lewis's literary society, the Inklings. In this setting Williams read (and improved) his final published novel, All Hallows' Eve. He heard J. R. R. Tolkien read aloud to the group some of his early drafts of The Lord of the Rings. In addition to meeting in Lewis's rooms at Oxford, they regularly met at The Eagle and Child pub in Oxford. During this time Williams gave lectures at Oxford on John Milton, William Wordsworth, and other authors. He received an honorary M.A. degree in 1943.

Williams is buried in Holywell Cemetery in Oxford. His headstone bears the word "poet" followed by the words "Under the Mercy", a phrase often used by Williams himself.

== Personal life ==
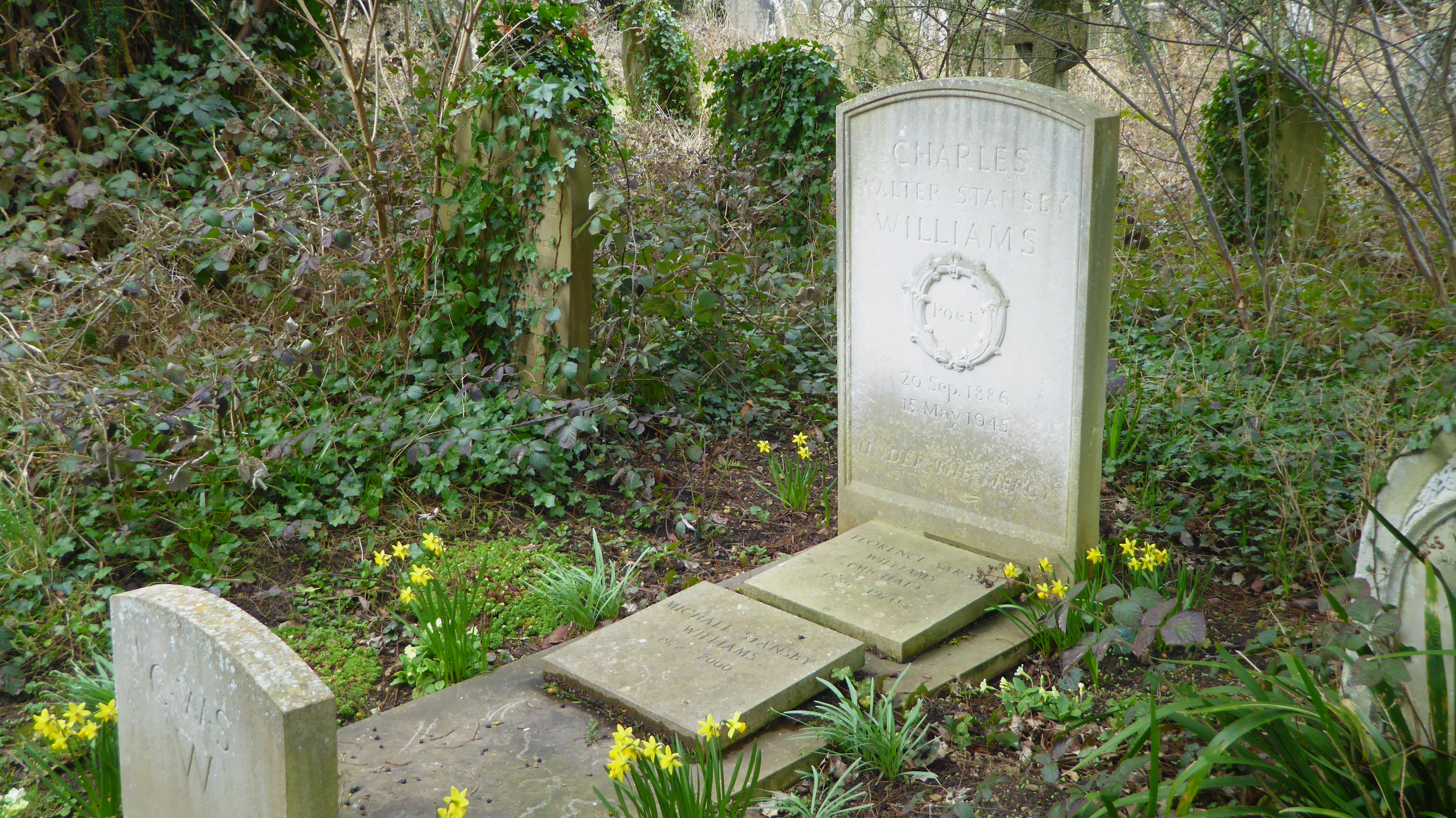
Williams's grave at Holywell Cemetery in Oxford

In 1917 Williams married his first sweetheart, Florence Conway, following a long courtship during which he presented her with a sonnet sequence that would later become his first published book of poetry, The Silver Stair. Williams nicknamed his wife 'Michal'. Their son Michael was born in 1922.

Williams was an unswerving and devoted member of the Church of England, reputedly with a tolerance of the scepticism of others and a firm belief in the necessity of a "doubting Thomas" in any apostolic body.

Charles, Florence and Michael are buried in Holywell Cemetery in Oxford, next to St Cross Church where they worshipped.

== Colleagues ==
Williams and C. S. Lewis became friends in 1936, when the two exchanged letters in expressing admiration for one another's work. Their close personal relationship and theological discussions influenced Lewis's later work. Lewis wrote the Preface to Essays presented to Charles Williams, originally intended as a festschrift for Williams, but published after his death. Essays were contributed by Lewis, Sayers, Tolkien, Owen Barfield, Gervase Mathew and Warren Lewis.

== Theology ==
Williams developed the concept of co-inherence and gave rare consideration to the theology of romantic love. Falling in love for Williams was a form of mystical envisioning in which one saw the beloved as he or she was seen through the eyes of God. Co-inherence was a term used in Patristic theology to describe the relationship between the human and divine natures of Jesus Christ and the relationship between the persons of the blessed Trinity. Williams extended the term to include the ideal relationship between the individual parts of God's creation, including human beings. It is our mutual indwelling: Christ in us and we in Christ, interdependent. It is also the web of interrelationships, social and economic and ecological, by which the social fabric and the natural world function. But especially for Williams, co-inherence is a way of talking about the Body of Christ and the communion of saints. He proposed founding an order, to be called the Companions of the Co-inherence, who would practice substitution and exchange, living in love-in-God, truly bearing one another's burdens, being willing to sacrifice and to forgive, living from and for one another in Christ. According to Gunnar Urang, co-inherence is the focus of all Williams's novels.

== Works ==
=== Fiction ===
He is writing that sort of book in which we begin by saying, let us suppose that this everyday world were at some one point invaded by the marvellous.

— C. S. Lewis on Charles Williams's novels

- 1930: War in Heaven (London: Victor Gollancz) – The Holy Grail surfaces in an obscure country parish and becomes variously a sacramental object to protect or a vessel of power to exploit.
- 1930: Many Dimensions (London: Victor Gollancz) – An evil antiquarian illegally purchases the fabled Stone of Suleiman (Williams uses this Muslim form rather than the more familiar King Solomon) from its Islamic guardian and returns to England to discover not only that the Stone can multiply itself infinitely without diminishing the original, but that it also allows its possessor to transcend the barriers of space and time.
- "Et in Sempiternum Pereant," a short story first published in The London Mercury, December 1935, in which Lord Arglay (protagonist in Many Dimensions) has his life put at risk encountering a ghost on the path to damnation. Later included in The Oxford Book of English Ghost Stories (London: Oxford University Press, 1986)
- 1931: The Place of the Lion (London: Mundanus) – Platonic archetypes begin to appear around an English country town, wreaking havoc and drawing to the surface the spiritual strengths and flaws of individual characters.
- 1932: The Greater Trumps (London: Victor Gollancz) – The original Tarot deck is used to unlock enormous metaphysical powers by allowing the possessors to see across space and time, create matter, and raise powerful natural storms.
- 1933: Shadows of Ecstasy (London: Victor Gollancz) – A humanistic adept has discovered that by focusing his energies inward he can extend his life almost indefinitely. He undertakes an experiment using African lore to die and resurrect his own body thereby assuring his immortality. His followers begin a revolutionary movement to supplant European civilisation. The first of Williams's novels to be written, though not the first published.
- 1937: Descent into Hell (London: Faber and Faber) – Generally thought to be Williams's best novel, Descent deals with various forms of selfishness, and how the cycle of sin brings about the necessity for redemptive acts. In it, an academic becomes so far removed from the world that he fetishises a woman to the extent that his perversion takes the form of a succubus. Other characters include a doppelgänger, the ghost of a suicidal Victorian labourer, and a playwright modelled in some ways on the author. Illustrates Williams's belief in the replacement of sin and substitutional love.
- 1945: All Hallows' Eve (London: Faber and Faber) – Follows the fortunes of two women after death and their interactions with those they knew before, contrasting the results of action based either on selfishness or an accepting love.
- 1970–72: The Noises That Weren't There. Unfinished. First three chapters published in Mythlore 6 (Autumn 1970), 7 (Winter 1971) and 8 (Winter 1972).

=== Plays ===
- c. 1912: The Chapel of the Thorn (edited by Sørina Higgins; Berkeley: Apocryphile Press, 2014)
- 1930: A Myth of Shakespeare (London: Oxford University Press)
- 1930: A Myth of Francis Bacon (Published in the Charles Williams Society Newsletter, 11, 12, and 14)
- 1929–31: Three Plays (London: Oxford University Press)
  - The Rite of the Passion (1929)
  - The Chaste Wanton (1930)
  - The Witch (1931)
- 1963: Collected Plays by Charles Williams (edited by John Heath-Stubbs; London: Oxford University Press)
  - Thomas Cranmer of Canterbury (1936). Canterbury Festival play, following T. S. Eliot's Murder in the Cathedral in the preceding (inaugural) year.
  - Seed of Adam (1937)
  - Judgement at Chelmsford (1939)
  - The Death of Good Fortune (1939)
  - The House by the Stable (1939)
  - Terror of Light (1940)
  - Grab and Grace (1941)
  - The Three Temptations (1942)
  - House of the Octopus (1945)
- 2000: The Masques of Amen House (edited by David Bratman. Mythopoeic Press).
  - The Masque of the Manuscript (1927)
  - The Masque of Perusal (1929)
  - The Masque of the Termination of Copyright (1930)

=== Poetry ===
- 1912: The Silver Stair (London: Herbert and Daniel)
- 1917: Poems of Conformity (London: Oxford University Press)
- 1920: Divorce (London: Oxford University Press)
- 1924: Windows of Night (London: Oxford University Press)
- 1930: Heroes and Kings (London: Sylvan Press)
- 1954: Taliessin through Logres (1938) and The Region of the Summer Stars (1944) (London: Oxford University Press)
- 1991: Charles Williams, ed. David Llewellyn Dodds (Woodbridge and Cambridge, UK: Boydell & Brewer: Arthurian Poets series). Part II, Uncollected and unpublished poems (pp. 149–281).

=== Theology ===
- 1938: He Came Down from Heaven (London: Heinemann).
- 1939: The Descent of the Dove: A Short History of the Holy Spirit in the Church (London: Longmans, Green)
- 1941: Witchcraft (London: Faber and Faber)
- 1942: The Forgiveness of Sins (London: G. Bles)
- 1958: The Image of the City and Other Essays (edited by Anne Ridler; London: Oxford University Press). Parts II through V
- 1990: Outlines of Romantic Theology (Grand Rapids, Mich.: Eerdmans)

=== Literary criticism ===
- 1930: Poetry at Present (Oxford: Clarendon Press).
- 1932: The English Poetic Mind (Oxford: Clarendon Press).
- 1933: Reason and Beauty in the Poetic Mind (Oxford: Clarendon Press)
- 1940: Introduction to Milton (based on a lecture at Oxford University), in The English Poems of John Milton (Oxford University Press)
- 1941: Religion and Love in Dante: The Theology of Romantic Love (Dacre Press, Westminster).
- 1943: The Figure of Beatrice (London: Faber and Faber)
- 1948: The Figure of Arthur (unfinished), in Arthurian Torso, ed. C. S. Lewis (London: Oxford University Press)
- 1958: The Image of the City and Other Essays (edited by Anne Ridler; London: Oxford University Press). Parts I and VI
- 2003: The Detective Fiction Reviews of Charles Williams (edited by Jared C. Lobdell; McFarland)
- 2017: The Celian Moment and Other Essays (edited by Stephen Barber; Oxford: The Greystones Press)

=== Biography ===
- 1933: Bacon (London: Arthur Barker)
- 1933: A Short Life of Shakespeare (Oxford: Clarendon Press). Abridgment of the 2-volume work by Sir Edmund Chambers
- 1934: James I (London: Arthur Barker)
- 1935: Rochester (London: Arthur Barker)
- 1936: Queen Elizabeth (London: Duckworth)
- 1937: Henry VII (London: Arthur Barker)
- 1937: Stories of Great Names (London: Oxford University Press). Alexander, Julius Caesar, Charlemagne, Joan of Arc, Shakespeare, Voltaire, John Wesley
- 1946: Flecker of Dean Close (London: Canterbury Press)

=== Other works ===
- 1931: Introduction, Poems of Gerard Manley Hopkins (Ed. Robert Bridges; 2nd ed.; London: Oxford University Press; OCLC 162569501)
- 1936: The Story of the Aeneid (London: Oxford University Press; OCLC 221046736)
- 1939: The Passion of Christ (Oxford University Press, New York, OCLC 5655518 London OCLC 752602153)
- 1940: Introduction, Søren Kierkegaard's The Present Age (trans. Dru and Lowrie; Oxford University Press; OCLC 2193267)
- 1943: Introduction, The Letters of Evelyn Underhill (Longmans, Green and Co.)
- 1958: The New Christian Year (Oxford University Press OCLC 7003710)
- 1989: Letters to Lalage: The Letters of Charles Williams to Lois Lang-Sims (Kent State University Press)
- 2002: To Michal from Serge: Letters from Charles Williams to His Wife, Florence, 1939–1945 (edited by Roma King Jr.; Kent State University Press)

== Sources ==
- Ashenden, Gavin (2007), Charles Williams: Alchemy and Integration, Kent State University Press.
- Carpenter, Humphrey (1978), The Inklings, London: Allen & Unwin.
- Cavaliero, Glen (1983), Charles Williams: Poet of Theology, Grand Rapids: Eerdmans.
- Dunning, Stephen M. (2000), The Crisis and the Quest – A Kierkegaardian Reading of Charles Williams, Paternoster Biblical and Theological Monographs.
- Fiddes, Paul S. (2015), "Charles Williams and the Problem of Evil", in C. S. Lewis and His Circle: Essays and Memoirs from the Oxford C. S. Lewis Society, edited by Roger White, Judith Wolfe, and Brendan N. Wolfe. pp. 65-88, Oxford University Press.
- Glyer, Diana Pavlac (2007), The Company They Keep: C. S. Lewis and J. R. R. Tolkien as Writers in Community, Kent, O.: Kent State University Press, ISBN 978-0-87338-890-0.
- Hadfield, Alice Mary (1983), Charles Williams: An Exploration of His Life and Work, Oxford: Oxford UP.
- Heath-Stubbs, John (1955), Charles Williams (British council pamphlets), Writers & their work, London: Longmans.
- Hefling, Charles (2011), "Charles Williams: Words, Images, and (the) Incarnation", in Hein, David; Henderson, Edward (eds.), C. S. Lewis and Friends: Faith and the Power of Imagination, London: SPCK, pp. 73–90.
- Hillegas, Mark R., ed. (1969), Shadows of Imagination: The Fantasies of C. S. Lewis, J. R. R. Tolkien, and Charles Williams, Carbondale and Edwardsville: Southern Illinois University Press.
- Horne, Brian (1995), Charles Williams: A Celebration, Gracewing, ISBN 0-852-44331-5.
- Howard, Thomas (1983), The Novels of Charles Williams, New York and London: Oxford University Press.
- Huttar, Charles A.; Schakel, Peter J., eds. (1996), The Rhetoric of Vision: Essays on Charles Williams, Lewisburg, London: Bucknell University Press, Associated University Presses.
- Karlson, Henry (2010), Thinking with the Inklings, CreateSpace Independent Publishing Platform, ISBN 978-1-4505-4130-5.
- King, Roma A. Jr. (1990), The Pattern in the Web: The Mythical Poetry of Charles Williams. Kent, O., and London: Kent State University Press.
- Lewis, C. S. (1948), "Williams and the Arthuriad," in Arthurian Torso, ed. C. S. Lewis, London: Oxford University Press, pp. 93–200.
- Lindop, Grevel (2015), Charles Williams: The Third Inkling, Oxford University Press
- Moorman, Charles (1960), Arthurian Triptych: Mythic Materials in Charles Williams, C. S. Lewis, and T. S. Eliot, Berkeley and Los Angeles: University of California Press.
- Moorman, Charles (1966), The Precincts of Felicity: The Augustinian City of the Oxford Christians. Gainesville: University of Florida Press.
- Roukema, Aren (2018), Esotericism and Narrative: The Occult Fiction of Charles Williams. Brill
- Shideler, Mary McDermott (1966), Charles Williams: A Critical Essay, Grand Rapids: Eerdmans.
- Owen, James A, The Chronicles of the Imaginarium Geographica (series) features Charles Williams, C. S. Lewis, and J. R. R. Tolkien as the main characters.
- Sibley, Agnes (1982), Charles Williams, Boston: Twayne.
- Walsh, Chad (1974), "Charles Williams' Novels and the Contemporary Mutation of Consciousness", in Montgomery, John Warwick (ed.), Myth, Allegory and Gospel: An Interpretation of J. R. R. Tolkien, C. S. Lewis, G. K. Chesterton, Charles Williams, Minneapolis: Bethany Fellowship, pp. 53–77.
- Ware, Kallistos (2015), "Sacramentalism in C. S. Lewis and Charles Williams", in C. S. Lewis and His Circle: Essays and Memoirs from the Oxford C. S. Lewis Society, edited by Roger White, Judith Wolfe, and Brendan N. Wolfe. pp. 53-64, Oxford University Press.
- Wendling, Susan (2006), "Charles Williams: Priest of the Co-inherence", in INKLINGS Forever, Vol. V, a collection of essays presented at the Fifth Frances White Ewbank Colloquium on C. S. Lewis and Friends, presented at Taylor University.
