= Water II: At Safe Distance =

Studio album by Zoogz Rift
- Released: June 1987
- Recorded: June – July 1987
- Studio: Trigon Studios (Los Angeles, CA)
- Genre: Experimental rock
- Length: 38:58
- Label: SST (137)
- Producer: Zoogz Rift

Zoogz Rift chronology
Water (1987)	Water II: At Safe Distance (1987)	Son of Puke (1987)

Professional ratings
Review scores
Source	Rating
Allmusic	3/5 stars

Water II: At Safe Distance is the seventh studio album by Zoogz Rift, released in June 1987 by SST Records.

== Track listing ==
All tracks are written by Zoogz Rift, except "Walk, Don't Run" by Johnny Smith and "Caught in a Dream" by Michael Bruce.

Side one
No.	Title	Length
1.	"Sleazeball"	3:42
2.	"Halloween"	3:00
3.	"M'Bugulu"	5:04
4.	"Ah Peeked in Duh Devil's Secret Hell Files"	6:56
5.	"Walk, Don't Run" (Johnny Smith cover)	2:16

Side two
No.	Title	Length
1.	"The Secret Marines Must Die"	4:41
2.	"Sweet Nausea Lick"	1:43
3.	"Caught in a Dream" (Alice Cooper cover)	2:00
4.	"I Can't Do This With You Looking at Me"	4:05
5.	"Strictly El Segundo"	2:51
6.	"Water II"	2:40

== Personnel ==
Adapted from the Water II: At Safe Distance liner notes.

- Zoogz Rift – vocals, guitar, production

Musicians

- Jack Brewer – vocals (A2, A4, B3)
- Scott Colby – slide guitar
- Mark Crawford – drums, percussion
- Alan Eugster – violin (A4, B2), synthesizer (A4, B2)
- Henry Kaiser – guitar (A5, B3, B4)
- Willie Lapin – bass guitar
- Eddy O'Bryan – guitar (A4, A5, B5), bass guitar (A4, A5, B5)

Musicians (cont.)

- Aaron Rift – vocals (A4), toy piano (A4)
- John Trubee – Minimoog (A4)
- Craig Unkrich – keyboards

Production and additional personnel

- John Golden – mastering
- Marc Mylar – recording, saxophone (A3)

== Release history ==
Region	Date	Label	Format	Catalog
United States	1987	SST	CS, LP	SST 137
