= Halloween (Mannheim Steamroller album) =

Studio album by Mannheim Steamroller
- Released: September 23, 2003
- Recorded: 2003
- Genre: New age
- Length: 89:43
- Label: American Gramaphone
- Producer: Chip Davis

Mannheim Steamroller chronology
American Spirit (2003)	Halloween (2003)	Halloween: Monster Mix (2004)

Mannheim Steamroller Halloween albums chronology
Halloween (2003)	Halloween: Monster Mix (2004)

Professional ratings
Review scores
Source	Rating
Allmusic	3/5 stars

Halloween is the first Halloween album by Mannheim Steamroller. The second disc of the double album is sound effects that are meant to be "shuffled" along with the music of disc one on a multi-CD player.

== Track listing ==
All tracks are written by Chip Davis, except where noted.

Disc 1
No.	Title	Writer(s)	Length
1.	"Toccata in de Mole"	Johann Sebastian Bach / Chip Davis	4:08
2.	"Hall of the Mountain King"	Edvard Grieg	2:51
3.	"Harvest Dance"		3:01
4.	"The Flying Dutchman"	Richard Wagner	3:36
5.	"Z-Row Gravity"		3:50
6.	"Funeral March of a Marionette"	Charles Gounod	3:00
7.	"Rock & Roll Graveyard"		3:51
8.	"Night on Bald Mountain"	Modest Mussorgsky	4:17
9.	"Crystal"		4:15
10.	"All Hallow's Eve"		3:42
11.	"The Sorcerer's Apprentice"	Paul Dukas	4:50
12.	"Rite of Twilight"	Igor Stravinsky / Marius Constant	4:45
13.	"Ride of the Valkyries"	Wagner	3:25

Disc 2
No.	Title	Length
1.	"Enchanted Forest"	4:01
2.	"The Other Side"	4:09
3.	"Enchanted Forest II"	1:38
4.	"The Reaper"	3:01
5.	"Ghost Voices"	4:42
6.	"Alien Spaceship"	5:33
7.	"Enchanted Forest III"	2:10
8.	"Mountain King"	3:42
9.	"Digital Death"	4:47
10.	"Souls Demise"	3:28
Total length:		89:43

== Personnel ==
- Chip Davis – Producer, Arranged By, Photography (Cover Photo)
- Brian Ackley – Remix, Engineer, Mastered By
- Arnie Roth – Concertmaster
- Louis Stout – Orchestral Assistant
- Bassoon – Lewis Kirk, Robert Barris
- Cello – Ann Monson, Barbara Haffner, Gary Stucka, Jocelyn Davis, Steve Houser, Vikki Mayne
- Contrabass – Brenda Donati, Larry Gray, Robert Kassinger, Scott Rosenthal
- Horn – Christine Worthing, Dale Clevenger, Gregory Flint, Jason Herrick
- Viola – Benton Wedge, Clara Takarabe, Daniel Strba, Karen Dirks, Loretta Gillespie, Marlou Johnston
- Violin – Allison Dalton, Amy Cutler, Arnie Roth, Carmen Llop, Clara Lindner, David Taylor, Fox Fehling, Jennifer Cappelli, Mark Agnor, Michael Shelton, Nissi Graf, Paul Phillips, Roberta Freier, Ron Satkiewicz, Sando Xia, Steven Boe
