= Ipecac (album) =

Studio album by Zoogz Rift
- Released: 1984
- Recorded: May – June 1984
- Studio: Trigon Studios (Los Angeles, CA)
- Genre: Experimental rock
- Length: 46:14
- Label: Snout (original release); SST (120) (reissue)
- Producer: Zoogz Rift

Zoogz Rift chronology
Amputees in Limbo (1982)	Ipecac (1984)	Interim Resurgence (1985)

Professional ratings
Review scores
Source	Rating
Allmusic	2/5 stars

Ipecac is the third studio album by the experimental rock composer Zoogz Rift, released in 1984 by Snout Records.

== Track listing ==
All tracks are written by Zoogz Rift.

Side one
No.	Title	Length
1.	"Ipecac"	1:54
2.	"Sunday Brunch With Fuad Ramses"	4:36
3.	"Sit Down & Shut Up"	8:03
4.	"Secret Marines 3-D"	4:03
5.	"Pump City"	3:25

Side two
No.	Title	Length
1.	"I Was the Only Boy at the Teen Girls' Slumber Party"	11:24
2.	"No Use"	4:48
3.	"Santa's on a Diet"	1:32
4.	"You Fucked Up"	6:29

== Personnel ==
Adapted from the Ipecac liner notes.

- Zoogz Rift – vocals, guitar, Casio VL-1 synthesizer, güiro, arrangement, production

Musicians

- Danny Buchanan – fretless bass, slide bass guitar
- Scott Colby – Dobro guitar (B1)
- M.B. Gordy – drums, tabla, bells
- Richie Hass – marimba, vibraphone, synthesizer
- Matt Karlsen – spoken word (A3)
- Marc Mylar – tenor saxophone, soprano saxophone, synthesizer, flute, engineering
- Jonathan "Mako" Sharkey – synthesizer

== Release history ==
Region	Date	Label	Format	Catalog
United States	1984	Snout	CS	
United States	1987	SST	CS, LP	SST 120
