= Nonentity (Water III: Fan Black Dada) =

Studio album by Zoogz Rift
- Released: May 1988
- Recorded: March 1988
- Studio: Trigon Studios (Los Angeles, CA)
- Genre: Experimental rock
- Length: 34:42 (vinyl edition); 67:27 (CD edition)
- Label: SST (184)
- Producer: Zoogz Rift

Zoogz Rift chronology
Son of Puke (1987)	Nonentity (Water III: Fan Black Dada) (1988)	Murdering Hell's Happy Cretins (1988)

Nonentity (Water III: Fan Black Dada) is the ninth studio album by experimental rock composer Zoogz Rift, released in May 1988 by SST Records.

== Release and reception ==
Professional ratings
Review scores
Source	Rating
AllMusic	4/5 stars

Richard Foss of AllMusic noted the more intimate tone of the material and claimed that "the quieter, more intimate setting fits the song very well." Critics of the Trouser Press said that the album was an excellent showcase of the band's talent coupled with Rift's unique guitar playing style.

== Track listing ==
All tracks are written by Zoogz Rift, except where noted.

Side one
No.	Title	Writer(s)	Length
1.	"Delinquent Payments"		8:57
2.	"Locked Out"		2:29
3.	"Look at the Fool" (Tim Buckley cover)	Tim Buckley	5:41

Side two
No.	Title	Writer(s)	Length
1.	"Chromium Slit Negatives"		2:18
2.	"With My Bare Hands"		11:26
3.	"When My Ship Rolls In"	John Trubee	3:48

CD Version
No.	Title	Writer(s)	Length
1.	"Delinquent Payments"		8:40
2.	"Locked Out"		2:10
3.	"Look at the Fool" (Tim Buckley cover)	Tim Buckley	5:21
4.	"Chromium Slit Negatives"		2:19
5.	"With My Bare Hands"		11:30
6.	"When My Ship Rolls In"	John Trubee	3:52
7.	"The Enigmatic Embrocation of Mrs. Compost Heap"		21:41
8.	"Bring It On Up" (Tim Buckley cover)	Tim Buckley	3:33
9.	"Helpless" (Tim Buckley cover)	Tim Buckley	8:18

== Personnel ==
Adapted from the Nonentity (Water III: Fan Black Dada) liner notes.

- Zoogz Rift – guitar, vocals, production, illustration

Musicians

- Richie Hass – drums, percussion
- Toby Holmes – trombone, tuba
- Rocky Howard – accordion
- Willie Lapin – bass guitar

Additional Musicians

- John Trubee – guitar ("The Enigmatic Embrocation of Mrs. Compost Heap")
- Craig Unkrich – synthesizer (B1, B3, "The Enigmatic Embrocation of Mrs. Compost Heap")

Production and additional personnel

- John Golden – mastering
- Marc Mylar – recording, photography

== Release history ==
Region	Date	Label	Format	Catalog
United States	1988	SST	LP	SST 184
United States	1990	SST	CD	SST 184
