= Hallows (surname) =

- Pronunciation: /ˈhæloʊz/
- Language: English

Origin
- Language: English
- Derivation: "halh" (hollow or sheltered spot"
- Meaning: "someone residing at a hollow"

Other names
- Variant form: Hallowes

Hallows is an English surname deriving from the Old English word halh meaning "hollow". Notable people with the surname include:

- Charlie Hallows (1895-1972), English cricketer
- E. Harold Hallows (1904-1974), American jurist
- James Hallows (1873-1910), English cricketer
- John Hallows (1907-1963), English professional footballer
- Norman Hallows (1886-1968), English athlete

== See also ==
- Hallowes (surname)
