= Hallowes =

- Pronunciation: /ˈhæloʊz/
- Language: English

Origin
- Language: English
- Derivation: "halh" (hollow or sheltered spot"
- Meaning: "someone residing at a hollow"

Other names
- Variant form: Hallows

Hallowes is an English surname deriving from the Old English word halh meaning "hollow". Notable people with this surname include:

- Geoffrey Hallowes (1918–2006), British officer of the Special Operations Executive during World War II
- Harry Hallowes, Irishman known in the mid 20th century for living on Hampstead Heath
- Ken Hallowes (1913–1995), Anglican bishop in South Africa
- Matthew Hallowes (born 1970), South African field hockey player
- Nathaniel Hallowes (1582–1661), English politician, Parliamentarian during the English Civil War
- Odette Hallowes (1912–1995), Allied intelligence officer during World War II
- Rupert Price Hallowes (1881–1915), British recipient of the Victoria Cross

== See also ==
- Hallows (surname)
