= 7th Heaven season 1 =

7th Heaven
- Season 1
- DVD cover
- No. of episodes: 22

Release
- Original network: The WB
- Original release: August 26, 1996 – May 19, 1997

Season chronology
- Next → Season 2

The first season of The WB American television drama series 7th Heaven premiered on August 26, 1996, and concluded on May 19, 1997, with a total of 22 episodes.

== Cast and characters ==
=== Main cast ===
- Stephen Collins as Eric Camden
- Catherine Hicks as Annie Camden
- Barry Watson as Matt Camden
- David Gallagher as Simon Camden
- Jessica Biel as Mary Camden
- Beverley Mitchell as Lucy Camden
- Mackenzie Rosman as Ruthie Camden
- Happy as Happy the Dog

== Episodes ==
No. overall	No. in season	Title	Directed by	Written by	Original release date	Prod. code	Viewers (millions)
1	1	"Anything You Want"	Sam Weisman	Brenda Hampton	August 26, 1996	1496003	2.8
The premiere episode introduces the Camdens, a family of seven who live in Glenoak, California. Protestant minister Eric and homemaker Annie enjoy a happy, loving marriage as they raise their five children: rebellious Matt (16), athletic Mary (14), emotional Lucy (12), inquisitive Simon (10), and adorable Ruthie (5). A cloud appears in this episode as Annie learns that her mother has been diagnosed with acute leukemia and is refusing treatment.
2	2	"Family Secrets"	Mark Sobel	Brenda Hampton	September 23, 1996	4296001	2.6
Eric and Annie fear the worst when they find out that their teenage son Matt is friends with a pregnant schoolmate Renee; while Mary tries to keep her new boyfriend Jeff (Matt's good friend) secret, Lucy can't wait to tell everyone about her crush on Jimmy Moon; Eric's shoes keep disappearing; Annie must break the news of her mother's illness to the children.
3	3	"In the Blink of an Eye"	Duwayne Dunham	Catherine LePard	September 30, 1996	4296002	2.5
When her parents call to postpone that weekend's visit, Annie worries that her mother is worse so she catches the next plane for Phoenix; with Annie gone, Eric lets Matt take his place at a volunteer event; Lucy starts dating Jimmy; Annie brings home serious news.
4	4	"No Funerals and a Wedding"	Mark Jean	Molly Newman	October 7, 1996	4296003	2.6
Annie feels abandoned when her father says he is going straight home after the funeral; Mary feels suffocated by Jeff; Lucy grieves Grandma Jenny deeply and Ruthie desperately wants to hear her grandma's favorite song to hold onto her memory; Simon asks everyone the difficult question "Where is Heaven?"; Matt helps Renee deliver her baby when the father can't be found; Eric counsels a troubled young married couple who are having communication problems.
5	5	"The Color of God"	Burt Brinckerhoff	Brenda Hampton	October 14, 1996	4296004	3.1
When a local African-American church is burned down by an unknown racist group, the Camdens invite longtime friend Reverend Morgan Hamilton and his family to share Sunday services with them and move into their home temporarily. Amidst these tragic and hateful events, the kids struggle to get along and defend their friendships with one another in a racist society. Meanwhile, Eric and Annie are determined to help solve Morgan and Patricia's marital troubles.
6	6	"Halloween"	Nick Havinga	Molly Newman	October 28, 1996	4296006	3.6
As Halloween approaches, Eric struggles with memories that have haunted him every Halloween since childhood; Lucy uncovers the truth about reclusive neighbor Mike Mitchell (Richard Moll), who's rumored to murder one child each Halloween; Simon is determined to win the pumpkin-carving contest; as the family gets ready for the church's costume party, there's only one way Mary wants to spend Halloween night and she resorts to schemes and lies to make it happen.
7	7	"Saturday"	David Semel	Jack LoGiudice	November 4, 1996	4296005	3.6
Feeling nervous about an important basketball game, Mary un-invites her family to it; Lucy loses track of Simon and Ruthie while babysitting; Eric tries to coax a teenage drug addict back into rehab. Eventually the family ends up at Mary's game...except for Lucy, and at home Eric invites her to a one-on-one father/daughter dinner.
8	8	"What Will People Say?"	Duwayne Dunham	Brenda Hampton	November 11, 1996	4296007	3.6
Rumors spread around town when Eric is seen walking into a hotel with a married woman. His family wants to trust him, but even they worry when he refuses to tell them what he was doing there, but he has a very good reason; Matt tries to keep things moving slowly between Mary and her new boyfriend; when a note gets intercepted and read aloud, an embarrassed Simon tries to get out of school.
9	9	"See No Evil, Hear No Evil, Speak No Evil"	Harry Harris	Catherine LePard	November 18, 1996	4296008	3.1
After Annie and Matt are carjacked, Matt is afraid to leave the house, while Annie resumes her normal activities with no apparent emotional damage; Lucy fears that running against Jimmy Moon for class president will harm their relationship; Mary contemplates getting a tattoo against her parents' wishes.
10	10	"The Last Call for Aunt Julie"	Joel J. Feigenbaum	Ron Zimmerman	November 25, 1996	4296009	3.6
The family welcomes Eric's sister, Julie, for a Thanksgiving visit until they learn a secret about her that physically threatens Simon and throws the family into turmoil.
11	11	"Now You See Me"	Harvey S. Laidman	Charles Lazer	December 16, 1996	4296010	3.2
The Camdens become suspicious when Matt's new girlfriend Tia wants to spend more time with the family than with just Matt; Lucy desperately wants to make the cheerleading squad and isn't thrilled by Mary's lack of support; Annie yearns for more surprises in her marriage; Simon tries to convince the family that he can make himself invisible.
12	12	"With a Little Help from my Friends"	Burt Brinckerhoff	Brenda Hampton & Jack LoGiudice	January 13, 1997	4296011	3.02
Matt starts skipping school and church to help elderly parishioner Mrs. Gladys Bink, who doesn't want anybody to know she's struggling; Eric works hard to help an out-of-work family who live in their van; Lucy fears that nobody cares about her upcoming 13th birthday; Happy delivers her puppies.
13	13	"America's Most Wanted"	Mark Jean	Brenda Hampton	January 27, 1997	4296013	3.21
As part of her school basketball team's ritual, Mary is elected to steal a drinking glass from local teen hangout The Varsity, but it's Matt who faces theft charges and potential jail time; Lucy is guilt-ridden after turning in one of Mary's old papers as her own; after hearing Eric rant about people not knowing "The Star-Spangled Banner," Ruthie thinks she'll have to leave the country if she doesn't learn it, so she enlists Simon to teach it to her.
14	14	"Seven is Enough"	Harry Harris	Catherine LePard & Ron Zimmerman	February 3, 1997	4296012	3.17
All three Camden generations dread the annual visit of Eric's parents, "The Colonel" and Grandma Ruth Camden. Tension mounts between father and son when the Colonel harshly criticizes Eric's children, then scoffs at Eric and Annie's desire to adopt a troubled 9-year-old boy who has been hiding in Eric's office. Meanwhile, Annie makes a shocking discovery at a local store and struggles to deal with Lucy, who can't seem to connect with her grandparents.
15	15	"Happy's Valentine"	David Semel	Brenda Hampton	February 10, 1997	4296014	3.84
Matt is left in charge of his siblings when his parents go on a romantic Valentine's Day campout with Morgan and Patricia Hamilton: Matt and John Hamilton plan to have a double date at the house, but then Mary and Keesha's plan to have a few friends over to watch movies turns into a huge party and their big brothers neglect their dates to deal with it. Amidst all this, Happy slips out of the house in search of her puppies and gets hit by a car. During the kids' vigil at the animal hospital, aided by a caring veterinarian (June Lockhart). Simon blames Matt but retracts his words upon further inspection. Meanwhile, the mood of the adults' evening shifts when Patricia's ex calls.
16	16	"Brave New World"	Harvey S. Laidman	Catherine LePard	February 17, 1997	4296015	4.02
Worried that something might be wrong at her best friend Suzanne's house, Lucy asks Eric to check it out; Matt tries to protect Mary from a jerk's harassment, but she insists on handling it herself; Ruthie begins pre-kindergarten.
17	17	"Choices"	Kevin Inch	Sue Tenney	April 14, 1997	4296016	3.56
During a rare stint in detention Mary meets wild, rule-breaking Camille (Keri Russell), and against Mary's better judgement, Camille talks her into making a foolish decision; at home, Eric and Annie counsel a former colleague of Eric's with a painful secret; Lucy confuses her father by wanting to research other religions; and Simon and Ruthie find trouble at the pet shop.
18	18	"Faith, Hope and the Bottom Line"	Burt Brinckerhoff	Catherine LePard	April 21, 1997	4296017	2.72
Eric wants to hire an ex-convict as the new organist, but the church vestry would rather put the budget money into a security system, and acting church treasurer Annie must determine whether enough money would be left to hire a new organist; meanwhile, Lucy's imagination runs wild after she asks Mary to tutor her boyfriend Jimmy; Simon wants Matt to help him out of getting a tetanus shot he needs for his upcoming Little League season; feeling empowered by her new class phone list, Ruthie decides to test the emergency numbers.
19	19	"It's About George"	Harry Harris	Ron Zimmerman	April 28, 1997	4296018	3.05
Eric's difficult-to-please parents arrive with their newly-adopted young son George, and everyone is pleased to discover that they seem different (in a good way) since taking him in, but then his biological father turns up, determined to be part of his son's life. Meanwhile, Julie is out of rehab and terrified to reconnect with her family; and with help from Matt and Mary, Lucy prepares Jimmy to meet the formidable grandparents.
20	20	"Say Good-Bye"	Gabrielle Beaumont	Brenda Hampton & Sue Tenney	May 5, 1997	4296019	2.93
Annie's oldest friend, man-crazy divorcee Rachel, makes a pass at Matt; Mary goes to a coffeehouse with Matt and Rachel and makes her public singing debut there when the band's singer doesn't show up. When she gets a phone call asking her to fill in again, Eric and Annie are shocked but permit it with one condition: they're going with her. Back at home, Ruthie has a going-away party for her longtime imaginary friend Hooey, and Lucy tries to cope with the fact that her best friend Suzanne is moving away.
21	21	"Dangerous Liaisons" (Part 1)	Harvey S. Laidman	Teleplay by : Brenda Hampton & Ron Zimmerman; Story by : Brenda Hampton	May 12, 1997	4296020	3.26
Annie is thrilled that her father is visiting for the first time since her mother's death--then furious when he introduces her to his new ladyfriend; Simon convinces Lucy that she would look good with a blonde rinse; Mary meets someone with a secret; Matt becomes attracted to a deaf girl; a potential family tragedy puts everyone's problems into perspective. To be continued...
22	22	"Dangerous Liaisons" (Part 2)	Harvey S. Laidman	Teleplay by : Brenda Hampton & Catherine LePard; Story by : Brenda Hampton	May 19, 1997	4296021	4.15
As Mary faces surgery and a long recovery, she and her family must face the possibility of her basketball career being over; Annie has only one option if she wants to keep her father in her life; Matt drives Heather further away when he gets into an ugly confrontation with a classmate; Lucy realizes the truth about Jimmy's feelings for her; Wilson and Mary are eager to start dating, but he must share a few important details with Eric first.
