= All Hallows' Eve (novel) =

Novel by Charles Williams

First edition cover

All Hallows' Eve is the last of the seven novels of the supernatural written by Charles Williams. Published by Faber and Faber in 1945, it went through three impressions that year and another in 1947. In 1948 it was published in the US by Pellegrini & Cudahy with an introduction by T. S. Eliot. There were two later translations into Italian and Spanish.

== Plot ==
In October 1945, the 25-year-old Lester Furnival finds herself alone on Westminster Bridge in a becalmed city. She had been on the way to meet her old school friend Evelyn when both were killed by a crashing aeroplane. Later they wander the deserted streets while Evelyn keeps up a gabble of complaint, refusing to face the fact of her predicament.

Meanwhile, in the world of the living, Lester's former husband Richard goes to visit his close friend, the painter Jonathan Drayton. Jonathan asks for Richard's opinion of two paintings on which he is working. One is a blitzscape of London with novel light effects; the other is of the ambiguous Simon Leclerc, a charismatic religious figure who has recently come from America. Jonathan is engaged to Betty, another of Lester's former acquaintances from school, while Betty's mother, Lady Wallingford, is a member of Father Simon's inner circle. But Lady Wallingford finds the painting of Simon and his beetle-like congregation repellent when she comes to view it and storms out of the studio, forbidding Betty to have anything more to do with Jonathan.

Simon is in fact a Jewish magician, born in Paris at the end of the 18th century, with an urge to master the world. Betty is Simon's daughter by Lady Wallingford. She had been engendered to carry out Simon's purposes – in the present case to travel forward in time, read the newspapers a few weeks into the future, then return and repeat what she has learned. Though this takes its physical toll on her, Betty feels happy during the period she is liberated from her body. Now, however, she is in love with Jonathan and calls out his name while she is still in the twilit world through which she moves and in which Lester and Evelyn are trapped. Hearing Betty's call and recognising her, the two women locate the house in Highgate where she lives, but only Lester enters. She is present when the exhausted Betty disembodies again and the two meet in a healing reunion.

Curiosity sends Richard to visit Simon's Holborn headquarters, where the magician lives surrounded by an adoring community of people he has healed miraculously. During a 'Relaxation' session he attends with them all, Richard is disturbed by seeing Evelyn enter through the walls and exchange a smile with Simon. Now distrusting the man, Richard goes to fetch Jonathan and the two visit the Wallingford's house in Highgate and interrupt Simon at the moment he is attempting to make Betty's discorporation permanent. Lester lends her the strength to resist but the invisible City, sustained by millennia of fellow-feeling, had also entered the battle now to thwart the foreign body of self-seeking in its midst.

Earlier in his career, Simon had divided himself into three and sent the two others to evangelise Russia and China with the same message of love that he preaches. With the coming of peace, he was orchestrating a demand for the three charismatic teachers to be invited to draw up a blueprint for world governance. As a means of neutralising further interference with his plans, Simon summons Evelyn and gets her to bring Lester to him. Having created a female homunculus, he persuades Evelyn and Lester to enter it and experience again the world they have lost. But Lester only does so in order to defeat Simon. Telephoning Jonathan, Richard and Betty, she persuades them to go out to Holborn together and confront Simon as All Hallows' Eve approaches.

Simon has been planning to kill Betty magically with the aid of her mother by creating a simulacrum and stabbing it with a steel needle, but he is interrupted by the arrival of Betty's friends and then by the return of his emanations. As he loses personal power, he is absorbed into primal matter and his former cures among his community are reversed. Lester now departs into the light of eternity, leaving the task of healing the sick again to Simon's child.

== Themes ==
Glen Cavaliero has stated that the novels of Charles Williams, of which All Hallows' Eve is the last, move towards "an ever more perfect fusion of natural with supernatural". The magical ceremonies that are meticulously described play a leading role in the plot's development and are not all the product of the author's imagination. T. S. Eliot, in his introduction to the American edition, raises the possibility that some may have been "borrowed from the literature of the occult". Williams had, indeed, once belonged to A. E. Waite's Rosicrucian order, itself one of many offshoots of the Hermetic Order of the Golden Dawn. Waite's order, however, was predominantly directed towards Christian mysticism, although it had its ceremonious rituals.

The magical ceremonies described in the novel are directed by Simon Leclerc in an increasingly desperate effort to subordinate Betty to his will, now that the complication of her love for Jonathan Drayton challenges his influence. The effort to make a final division between Betty's material and spirit bodies fails when Lester substitutes herself. It is a double failure, however, leading to the curtailment of Simon's power. Simon had persisted with his ceremony even when it was plainly not going to work, thus breaking a fundamental rule in magic. His will to dominate increasingly interferes with his clarity of purpose thereafter. The second ceremony involves the creation of the homunculus as a way of removing Lester. Though successful in itself, Simon's contempt for those he manipulates makes him underestimate the power of love. Lester now has a spiritual bond with Betty and also wishes to make amends to her husband; the acquisition of a body, however deformed, is the means by which she can thwart Simon's murderous intention yet again, which his lack of empathy is unable to foresee.

Love and hate are pitted against each other in other ways too. As a child Betty had been secretly christened by her nurse, who had made the Holy Spirit her sponsoring godparent. This is the third ceremony in the novel, described when Betty visits her old nurse with Jonathan. The fourth ceremony is Simon's consequentially foredoomed attempt to destroy Betty by means of a clay figure to which hairs from her brush have been added. In terms of the mechanics of the novel, the mistake made here is allowing ill-will to intrude into what should be a selfless ceremony. It is at this point, as Simon stabs at the image, and then at Betty herself, that the last of his power disappears and the cries of his followers are heard as they discover the cures he performed on them have now been reversed.

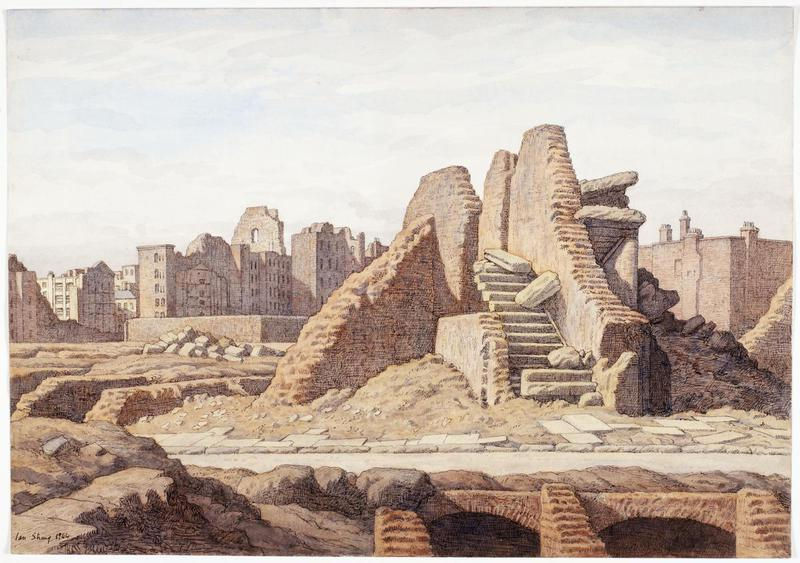
The London blitzscape

The identity and function of the figure of Simon has been the subject of frequent discussion. A parallel is suggested with the figure of Simon Magus, an early convert to Christianity who used his position for personal benefit. There is also a hint that the character is based on Aleister Crowley, especially in so far as Simon Leclerc has made his name by preaching a message of love purely out of self-interest. William Butler Yeats, who knew Crowley from his days in the Order of the Golden Dawn, had commented of his magical colleague that "For all his mouthings of the word 'Christ', Christianity seems never to have penetrated." Another interpretation of Simon is that he represents the figure of the Antichrist. In his drive for personal dominion, Simon dismisses Jesus in his thoughts as an ineffectual forerunner, "that other sorcerer of his race, the son of Joseph". For him, too, his more recent rival, Adolf Hitler, was nothing but a fool : "I am the one to come, not Hitler!" It was seldom that Williams allowed contemporary events to penetrate his mythologies of good and evil quite so overtly.

The symbolic City through which Lester and Evelyn wander at first is far less clearly depicted, perhaps because, as Glen Cavaliero describes it, the concept is to be understood on so many levels. Firstly it is Jonathan Dayton's blitzscape, the contemporary London punctured with ruins, an outlook projected into the dusky world through which the dead women wander. But on closer examination it is the archetypal City, there as a potentiality in a time before there were inhabitants on the spot and prolonged into the unknowable future. Ultimately, it is not the named city of London but all cities and that "sense of many relationships between men and women woven into a unity" that Williams had described in his essay "The Image of the City in English Verse" (1939). From a theological point of view, this is The City of God, sustained by the communion of saints, that refuses into itself the spirit of egocentric exploitation that Simon represents. At this level, as Eliot said of the whole novel, "What [Williams] had to say was beyond his resources, and probably beyond the resources of language, to say once for all through any one medium of expression."

== See also ==
- Charles Williams novels online or to download
