= All Hallows Catholic College, Macclesfield =

Secondary school in Macclesfield, England

All Hallows' Catholic College

Location
- Brooklands Avenue; Macclesfield, Cheshire, SK11 8LB; England
- Coordinates: 53°15′23″N 2°08′29″W

Information
- Type: Academy
- Motto: Christi Crux Est Mea Lux (The Cross of Christ is My Light)
- Religious affiliation: Roman Catholic
- Founder: Diocese of Shrewsbury
- Department for Education URN: 139139 Tables
- Ofsted: Reports
- Principal: Tim Beesley
- Gender: Coeducational
- Age: 11 to 18
- Enrolment: 1251
- Website: allhallows.org.uk

All Hallows' Catholic College is a Roman Catholic co-educational secondary school and sixth form in Macclesfield in Cheshire, England. It educates approximately 1200 children between 11 and 18 years of age. The college became a voluntary academy on 1 January 2013 replacing the former voluntary aided status, and is supported by its trustees, the Catholic Diocese of Shrewsbury. The school opened as All Hallows' Catholic High School in 1962 and the first head teacher was William Blackledge, who was followed by Richard K. Weremczyk. The principal as of February 2026 is Tim Beesley. The school was renamed a college following designation as a specialist college for business and enterprise with ethics in 2006. The additional specialism of languages was added in 2010 and the college is now a faith school specialising in Business, Ethical Enterprise and Languages. All Hallows is a National Support School. It is also the National Teacher Effectiveness Enhancement Programme (TEEP) Champion Centre, and is a partner in three Teaching School Alliances.

The college offers language specialisms in French, Spanish, German and Mandarin.

== Curriculum ==
The college follows the National Curriculum with particular emphasis on the expressive arts, sports, and business and enterprise with ethics. Languages specialism was added in 2010 and since September 2011 there is the provision for students to learn more than one language until GCSE studies begin (year 10), when only one can be taken forward. Students can choose from German, Spanish, French, Mandarin and Latin.

Languages are also offered at A-Level (Level 3).

The college follows the following Key Stages:

- KS3: Y7-Y9
- KS4: Y10 & Y11
- KS5: Y12 & Y13

== All Hallows' Learning Community ==
All Hallows' Learning Community is a partnership of Church schools which work as a closely networked community. In addition to All Hallows Catholic College, the schools involved in the community are:

- St Alban's Catholic Primary (Macclesfield)
- St Benedict's Catholic Primary (Handforth)
- Christ The King Primary School (Macclesfield)
- St Gregory's Catholic Primary (Bollington)
- St Mary's Catholic Primary (Congleton)
- St Paul's Catholic Primary (Poynton)
- St John the Evangelist Church of England Primary School (Macclesfield)

The Holy Family of Nazareth Academy Trust was established in January 2013 for schools in the partnership who wish to become voluntary academies.

== Oftsed ==
In 2013, the college received an Outstanding grade following a full inspection.

Following the removal of the one word Oftsed judgement from September 2024, the college received another visit. The grading was broken down into five sub-areas:

Area	Judgement
Quality of education	Good
Behaviour and attitudes	Good
Personal development	Outstanding
Leadership and management	Good
Sixth form provision	Outstanding

The 2024 report concluded:

Pupils, including students in the sixth form, thrive at All Hallows Catholic College. The school’s mission, for pupils to ‘aspire not to have more but to be more’, underpins every aspect of school life. Pupils show respect and compassion for others. They have warm relationships with staff. Sixth-form students act as exemplary role models.

The school has high aspirations for all pupils, including those who are disadvantaged or those with special educational needs and/or disabilities (SEND). Pupils are expected to achieve well, and most do.

Pupils behave well in lessons and around school. They know that any discriminatory behaviour will not be tolerated. If this type of behaviour does happen, pupils are confident to report incidents. They know that the school will deal with them effectively. Pupils feel safe and well cared for in school.

Pupils are grateful for all the opportunities that the school provides for them to develop their confidence, skills and talents. These include sports clubs, choirs, a tactical games club and the Duke of Edinburgh’s Award. There are lots of opportunities to take on responsible roles, such as being anti-bullying ambassadors or members of the ‘Eco-Council’.
