= Many Dimensions =

1931 novel by Charles Williams

First edition

Many Dimensions is the second of the novels of the supernatural by Charles Williams. The original publisher was Victor Gollancz Ltd in 1931. Following Williams' death it was republished by Faber & Faber in 1947 in the UK and in 1949 by Pellegrini & Cudahy in the US. In 1952 it was issued in the Penguin Books green-covered Mystery & Crime series.

The novel describes the occult results following acquisition of a stone from the diadem of King Solomon, exploring the themes of time travel, the nature of the universe, and the moral consequences of selfish motivation.

== Plot ==
An unscrupulous researcher, Sir Giles Tumulty, has acquired a precious stone from the ancient crown of King Solomon by dubious means and proposes to research its supernatural qualities, along with his stockbroker nephew, Reginald Montague. They are opposed by representatives of the Stone's traditional Muslim guardians in the Persian embassy who view these activities as blasphemous. The powers of the Stone include perfect replication of itself and the ability to move its owners through time and space in a moment. There are, however, certain logical complications that make its use hazardous, as Sir Giles discovers while experimenting.

Montague approaches another uncle, Chief Justice Lord Arglay, for a loan to help exploit the Stone's commercial properties. Also present at their interview is Chloe Burnett, Arglay's secretary, who is helping him write a dissertation on his concept of Organic Law. This is envisaged as an inalterable and universal ideal of abstract justice which Arglay ultimately comes to believe is contained within the Stone, when he examines it, as encompassing the first matter of the universe.

Meanwhile, Montague has sold one of the Stone's replications (referred to as a Type) to the businessman Angus Sheldrake as a gift for his wife Cecilia. Arglay sends Chloe to try and repossess it in the company of her boyfriend Frank Lindsay but they are unsuccessful. However, Cecilia loses the Stone while out in the country, where it is retrieved by the artist Oliver Doncaster and taken to his lodgings in the small town of Rich-by-the-Mere. There the Stone is responsible for a series of miraculous cures of the sick, which is followed by rioting when Sheldrake reclaims his property. Government figures now intervene for selfish motives of their own and call in the equally interested Sir Giles as their advisor.

Others who now wish to suppress information about the Stone are the capitalist Sheldrake and the Transport Union leader Merridew who foresee in it a threat to their livelihoods. The latter finds out Frank's connection with Chloe and bribes him to try and obtain the Type of the Stone in Chloe's possession. But by the time Prince Ali, the Embassy's First Secretary, attempts to steal it, the Stone has been potentiated to protect its purity from those with flawed motivation and his badly burned body is found outside in the street. Thereafter the Stone calls the other Types back into itself, causing the deaths of Montague and Tumulty in the process, and indirectly wrecking the later careers of all who had been involved with it.

== Themes ==
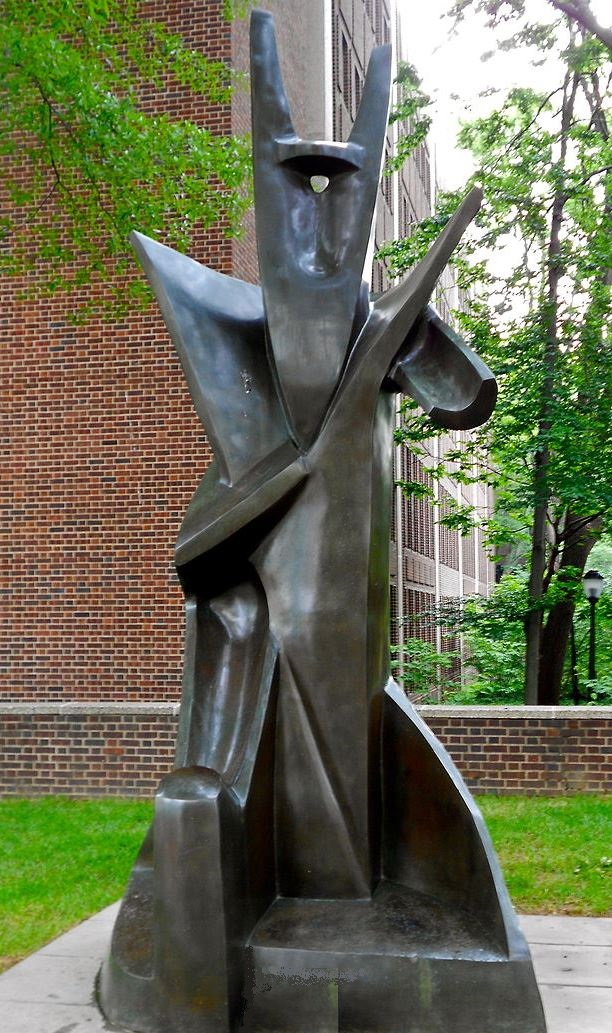
Archipenko's multi-dimensional sculpture of the crowned King Solomon

"Nowhere is the intellectual quality of Williams' imagination more apparent than in Many Dimensions", Glen Cavaliero has remarked, but this has contributed to criticism of his performance in this novel. The female characters in his fiction are often unsatisfactorily realised because Williams is more focussed on the ideals they embody than on their personality. They therefore seem, as in the case of Chloe in Many Dimensions, "formulaic and superficial". In other ways too, Aren Roukema has pointed to how far "Williams' tendency to stretch symbolism and allegory to the point of didacticism" disrupts the novel's narrative continuity.

In other respects, aspects of Williams' personal history have contributed to the story. Chloe herself is modelled on Phyllis Jones, his younger colleague at Oxford University Press, with whom he had an unconsummated love affair. This he transmutes into Chloe's otherwise inexplicable dependent relationship with Lord Arglay. Again, many of the esoteric ideas treated in Many Dimensions can be traced back to the earlier period, before he began writing his novels of the supernatural, when Williams' interest in the occult associated him with A. E. Waite's Fellowship of the Rosy Cross. In particular the phrase "the end of desire", used of close association with the Stone in the novel, can be traced to the Fellowship's ritual of attaining the higher self within, in which the adept repeats "I am that which I thought and the end of my desire is with me".

Roukema comments that the word 'end' is given a deliberately double meaning and is understood differently depending on the spiritual development of the characters in the novel. It may mean cessation of desire, or else, as a goal, the fulfilment of desire. But in terms of the mystic union with the Stone that Chloe attains, its special meaning is also awareness of the primordial oneness of Creator and created, so that there is nothing outside that state to which one can become attached. In this way, by offering herself to the Stone, Chloe makes herself the channel through which the Stone can call back and reintegrate the divided Types whose meanings had been misinterpreted by their temporary possessors.

In Many Dimensions the Stone symbolises that "sense of the transcendent as it shines through the world of space and time" present in all of Williams' novels. It is presented in this case as embodying the Divine Logos, the active reason pervading and animating the Universe as understood in Greek and Hellenistic philosophy. In theological terms it is to be viewed as an emanation from a monotheistic source rather than an incarnation and has little to do with personalised Christian concepts such as fatherhood and sonship. The relationship between human and divine is therefore more appropriately expressed in the impersonal phrases "under the Protection" or "under the Mercy" used by the novel's Muslim Sufi characters.

The novel's "moral austerity" also derives from the more Eastern understanding in which actions are viewed as flowing from personal disposition, the consequences of which are mitigated neither by a special exercise of Divine Grace nor even Divine judgment. What happens to the characters is the direct and natural result of what their actions have already shown them to be. Cavaliero therefore perceives "the relation between predestination and free will" as being an allied theological theme explored by the book.

== Bibliography ==
- Glen Cavaliero, Charles Williams: Poet of Theology, Macmillan 1983
- Aren Roukema, Esotericism and Narrative: The Occult Fiction of Charles Williams, Brill 2018

== See also ==
- Novel online at Gutenberg
