= Stephen Collins =

American former actor (born 1947)

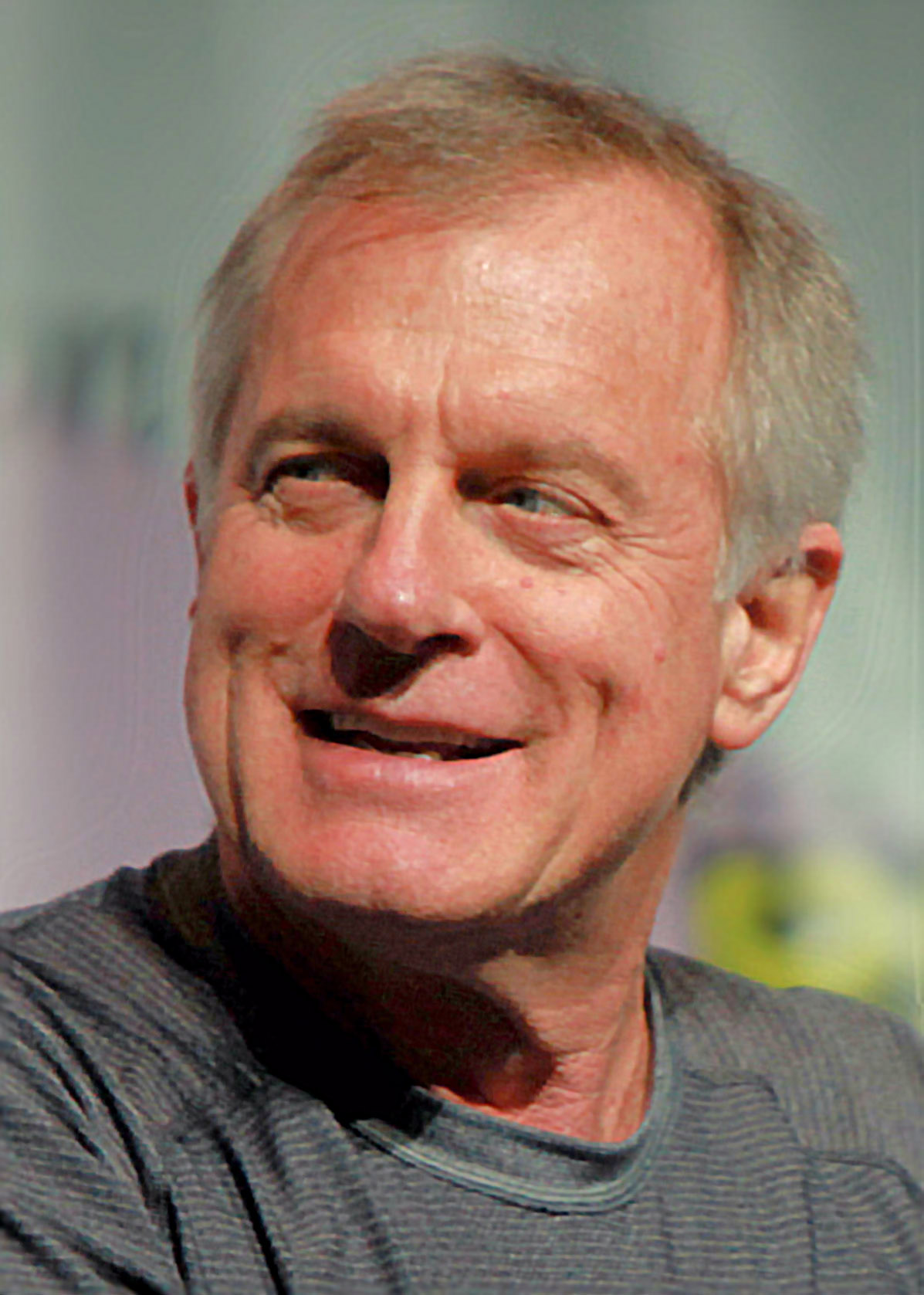
- Collins in 2014
- Born: Stephen Weaver Collins; October 1, 1947 (age 79); Des Moines, Iowa, U.S.
- Education: Amherst College
- Occupation: Actor
- Years active: 1971–2014
- Spouses: Marjorie Weinman (m. 1970; div. 1978) Faye Grant (m. 1985; div. 2015) Jenny Nagel (m. 2019)
- Children: 1
- Relatives: Max Collins (nephew)

Stephen Weaver Collins (born October 1, 1947) is an American former actor. He is known for playing Eric Camden on the WB/CW television series 7th Heaven from 1996 to 2007. Afterwards, Collins played the roles of Dayton King on the ABC television series No Ordinary Family and Gene Porter in the NBC television series Revolution, father of Elizabeth Mitchell's character, Rachel Matheson. Before 7th Heaven, Collins was known for his roles as Commander Willard Decker in the 1979 film Star Trek: The Motion Picture and pilot Jake Cutter in the ABC television series Tales of the Gold Monkey. In 2014, his career came to an end after he confessed to sexual abuse against multiple minors.

== Early life ==
Stephen Collins was born on October 1, 1947, in Des Moines, Iowa, to mother Madeleine (née Robertson) and father Cyrus Stickney Collins, an airline executive. Collins was raised with his two older brothers in Hastings-on-Hudson, New York, and attended Amherst College in Massachusetts, graduating cum laude. While at Amherst, he played bass guitar in a number of bands. He was also then a singing member of the Amherst College Zumbyes.

== Career ==
Stephen Collins is known for his role as Eric Camden in the television drama series 7th Heaven during the series' run from 1996 to 2007 and for his role as Captain Willard Decker in Star Trek: The Motion Picture (1979). His other notable television credits include Jake Cutter in the cult series Tales of the Gold Monkey and his role in Tattingers, as well as guest appearances in The Waltons, Barnaby Jones, Charlie's Angels, and numerous miniseries and television films. He was nominated for an Emmy Award for his work opposite Ann-Margret in the miniseries The Two Mrs. Grenvilles (1987), and played John F. Kennedy in the miniseries A Woman Named Jackie (1991), which won the Emmy for Best Miniseries. He also played the lead role opposite Lauren Hutton in the television film The Rhinemann Exchange (1977), based on Robert Ludlum's bestselling novel.

Collins was above-the-title billed in Loving Couples (1980) with Shirley MacLaine, James Coburn and Susan Sarandon. He co-starred with Diane Keaton in both The First Wives Club (1996) and Because I Said So (2007). He has co-starred with Meredith Baxter in three films, All the President's Men, A Woman Scorned: The Betty Broderick Story, and Her Final Fury: Betty Broderick, the Last Chapter, both of which were television films broadcast on CBS in 1992.

In the 2010–11 television season, Collins starred in the short-lived ABC series No Ordinary Family. On ABC's Brothers & Sisters, he played a potential love interest for Ron Rifkin's character Saul Holden. Collins appeared in season eight of The Office playing Andy Bernard's father in the episode, "Garden Party".

In 2013, Collins began appearing in the NBC series Revolution as Dr. Gene Porter, the leader of the town of Willoughby and father of Rachel Matheson (played by Elizabeth Mitchell). and in two episodes of Falling Skies in season three. His final guest spots include The Fosters, Devious Maids, and Penance.

== Personal life ==
Stephen Collins was married to Marjorie Weinman from 1970 to 1978. In 1985, he married actress Faye Grant, whom he had met on the set of Tales of the Gold Monkey in 1982. Together they have a daughter Kate, who was born in 1989. They separated in 2012, and a final divorce decree was issued in January 2015. In 2019, Collins began a relationship with Jenny Nagel, a 7th Heaven fan.

Collins is an Episcopalian and a practitioner of Transcendental Meditation (TM). He has taken part in the advanced TM Yogic Flying technique since 1980. Until October 2014, he was a national co-director of the Committee for Stress-Free Schools, which advocates practicing TM in schools and funds TM research.

Following becoming disgraced, he was forced to retire from acting, and Collins moved back to his native state of Iowa, buying a house in Fairfield, Iowa.

His nephew is musician Max Collins of the band Eve 6.

== Sexual abuse against minors ==
On October 7, 2014, the New York City Police Department began investigating Collins after an audio tape was leaked to the news media; on the tape was a male voice, said to be that of Collins, admitting past sexual abuse of a minor under the age of 14. At that time, a Los Angeles Police Department spokesperson stated that they had investigated Collins in 2012 after receiving a claim of sexual abuse, but had been unable to "substantiate the allegation".

In a December 2014 interview with People, Collins admitted to "inappropriate sexual conduct with three female minors" in 1973, 1982, and 1994.

The abuses were the subject of an episode of the 2025 documentary series Hollywood Demons.

== Filmography ==
=== Television ===
Year	Title	Role	Notes
1974	The Michele Lee Show	Dr. Steven Mayhill	Television pilot
1975	The Waltons	Todd Clarke	Episode: "The Abdication"
1976	Brink's: The Great Robbery	Agent Donald Nash	Television film
1977	The Rhinemann Exchange	David Spaulding	Miniseries
1978	Charlie's Angels	Steve Carmody	Episode: "Angel Come Home"
1980	The Henderson Monster	Pete Casimir	Television film
1981	Great Performances	Morton Fullerton	Episode: "Edith Wharton: Looking Back"
1981	Summer Solstice	Young Joshua Turner	Television film
1982	Inside the Third Reich	Karl Hanke	Television film
1982	Tales of the Gold Monkey	Jake Cutter	Main role
1983	Chiefs	Billy Lee	Miniseries
1984	Threesome	Peter Hatten	Television film
1984	Dark Mirror	Jim Eiseley	
1985	The Hitchhiker	Todd Fields	Episode: "And If We Dream"
1986	Hold the Dream	Shane O'Neil	Miniseries
1987	The Two Mrs. Grenvilles	Billy Grenville Jr.	Miniseries
1988	Weekend War	Captain John Deason	Television film
1988	Tattingers	Nick Tattinger	Main role
1990	Working It Out	David Stuart	Main role
1991	A Woman Named Jackie	John F. Kennedy	Miniseries
1992	A Woman Scorned: The Betty Broderick Story	Dan Broderick	Television film
1992	Her Final Fury: Betty Broderick, The Last Chapter	Dan Broderick	Television film
1993	Remember	Clee Donovan	Television film
1993	The Disappearance of Nora	Jack Fremont	Television film
1994	Scarlett	Ashley Wilkes	Miniseries
1995	A Family Divided	Roger Billingsley	Television film
1995	Sisters	Gabriel 'Gabe' Sorenson	Recurring
1996	On Seventh Avenue	Tom Aiken	Television film
1996	The Babysitter's Seduction	Bill Bartrand	Television film
1996	An Unexpected Family	Sam	Television film
1996–2007	7th Heaven	Rev. Eric Camden	Main role; directed 3 episodes
1998	An Unexpected Life	Sam	Television film
1999	As Time Runs Out	Dan Carlin	Television film
1999	Batman Beyond	Tony Maychek/Earthmover	Voice, episode: "Earth Mover"
2001	Jumping Ship	Gardener	Television film
2002	State of Grace	Norris Sinclair	Episode: "Sophisticated Ladies"
2005	Celebrity Poker Showdown	Himself	Qualified for the first tournament
2006–2007	It's Always Sunny in Philadelphia	Bruce Mathis	2 episodes
2008	Law & Order: Special Victims Unit	Pierson Bartlett	Episode: "Trade"
2008	Every Second Counts	Joe Preston	Television film
2009–2011	Private Practice	The Captain	4 episodes
2010	No Ordinary Family	Dayton King	Main role
2010	Brothers & Sisters	Charlie	Episode: "A Righteous Kiss"
2011	The Office	Walter Bernard	Episode: "Garden Party"
2013	Falling Skies	President Benjamin Hathaway	2 episodes
2013	Scandal	Reed Wallace	Episode: "Happy Birthday, Mr. President"
2013	The Fosters	Rev. Adams	Episode: "I Do"
2013	Devious Maids	Philippe Delatour	6 episodes
2013–2014	Revolution	Gene Porter	Main role
2014	Avengers Assemble	Howard Stark	Voice, episode: "Thanos Rising"

=== Films ===
Year	Title	Role	Notes
1976	All the President's Men	Hugh W. Sloan Jr.	
1977	Between the Lines	Michael	
1978	Fedora	Young Barry Detweiler	
1979	The Promise	Michael Hillyard	
1979	Star Trek: The Motion Picture	Captain/Commander Willard Decker	
1980	Loving Couples	Greg Plunkett	
1985	Brewster's Millions	Warren Cox	
1986	On Dangerous Ground	Dr. David Lowell	Alternate title: Choke Canyon
1986	Jumpin' Jack Flash	Marty Phillips	
1989	The Big Picture	Attorney	
1990	Stella	Stephen Dallas	
1992	My New Gun	Gerald Bender	
1996	The First Wives Club	Aaron Paradis	
1999	Drive Me Crazy	Mr. Maris	
2003	The Commission	Joseph A. Ball	
2006	Blood Diamond	Ambassador Walker	
2007	Because I Said So	Joe Dresden	
2008	Hole in the Paper Sky	Mr. Benson	
2012	The Three Stooges	Mr. Harter	
2014	Penance	Priest	Short

== Discography ==
Year	Title	Notes
1993	Sondheim: Putting It Together	Off-Broadway cast recording
2003	Stephen Collins	
2005	The Hits of Rick Nelson	

== Published works ==
- Collins, Stephen (1994). Eye Contact. Bantam. ISBN 978-0553095852.
- Collins, Stephen (1998). Double Exposure: A Novel. William Morrow. ISBN 978-0688158934.

Preceded by Jonathan Hadary; October 31, 2006 – June 5, 2008	Actor playing King Arthur on Spamalot; June 5, 2008 – September 14, 2008	Succeeded by Michael Siberry; September 16, 2008 – January 11, 2009
