= Vanities =

Comedy-drama stage production written by Jack Heifner

- Original language: English
- Written by: Jack Heifner
- Characters: Joanne; Kathy; Mary

Premiere
- Date: January 15, 1976
- Place: Playwrights Horizons; New York City

Vanities is a comedy-drama stage production written by Jack Heifner. The story centers on the lives and friendship of three Texas cheerleaders starting from high school in 1963, continuing through college as sorority sisters in 1968, and ending with the dissolution of their friendship in 1974 New York as their interests and livelihoods change and they are no longer as compatible with one another as they had been in their school days.

== Plot summary ==
Three best friends journey through high school, college and their later lives, as they remember all of their adventures. Joanne is a sweet, naive southern girl. Mary is very confident. Kathy is the planner.

Act 1: In high school in 1963, the three girls are the popular cheerleaders and are planning all of the social events.

Act 2: Joanne, Mary and Kathy are in college in the late 1960s, living together in the same sorority, Kappa Kappa Gamma, still planning events. Kathy expresses confusion about what she wants to do after college.

Act 3: Joanne marries Ted, her longtime boyfriend, and becomes extremely conservative. Mary opens an erotic art gallery and explores sexual liberation. Kathy ends up cynical and living day to day in New York City, with no job, and reads all of the books she was supposed to read in college. When they meet at Kathy's fabulous apartment in New York in 1974, they end up fighting. Joanne gets drunk and talks about how she never has a break from her kids and her husband Ted never lets her drink. Incensed by Joanne's sanctimonious airs, Mary reveals she has had an affair with Joanne's husband Ted. Joanne refuses to believe her and ultimately tells her, "Go fuck yourself!" and leaves the party in a huff. Kathy and Mary close the play by drinking "to forget" their "bygone days" together.

== Production history ==
Vanities had one of the longest Off-Broadway runs on record. The comedy opened at Playwrights Horizons, New York City on January 15, 1976, for 13 performances, and then transferred to the Chelsea Theatre Center (now the Westside Theatre) where it opened on March 22, 1976 and closed May 27, 1979, running for 1,313 performances. The cast included Kathy Bates as Joanne, Jane Galloway as Kathy and Susan Merson as Mary. Heifner received a 1976 Drama Desk Award nomination for Outstanding New Play. Other productions have been performed in colleges and theatres and continue to do so.

== Other versions ==
- The stage play was taped and presented on HBO in 1981, for the program Standing Room Only: Vanities starring Annette O'Toole, Meredith Baxter Birney and Shelley Hack.
- The play was adapted into a musical, Vanities: The Musical, which premiered Off-Broadway in 2023.
