= Tudi Wiggins =

Canadian actress

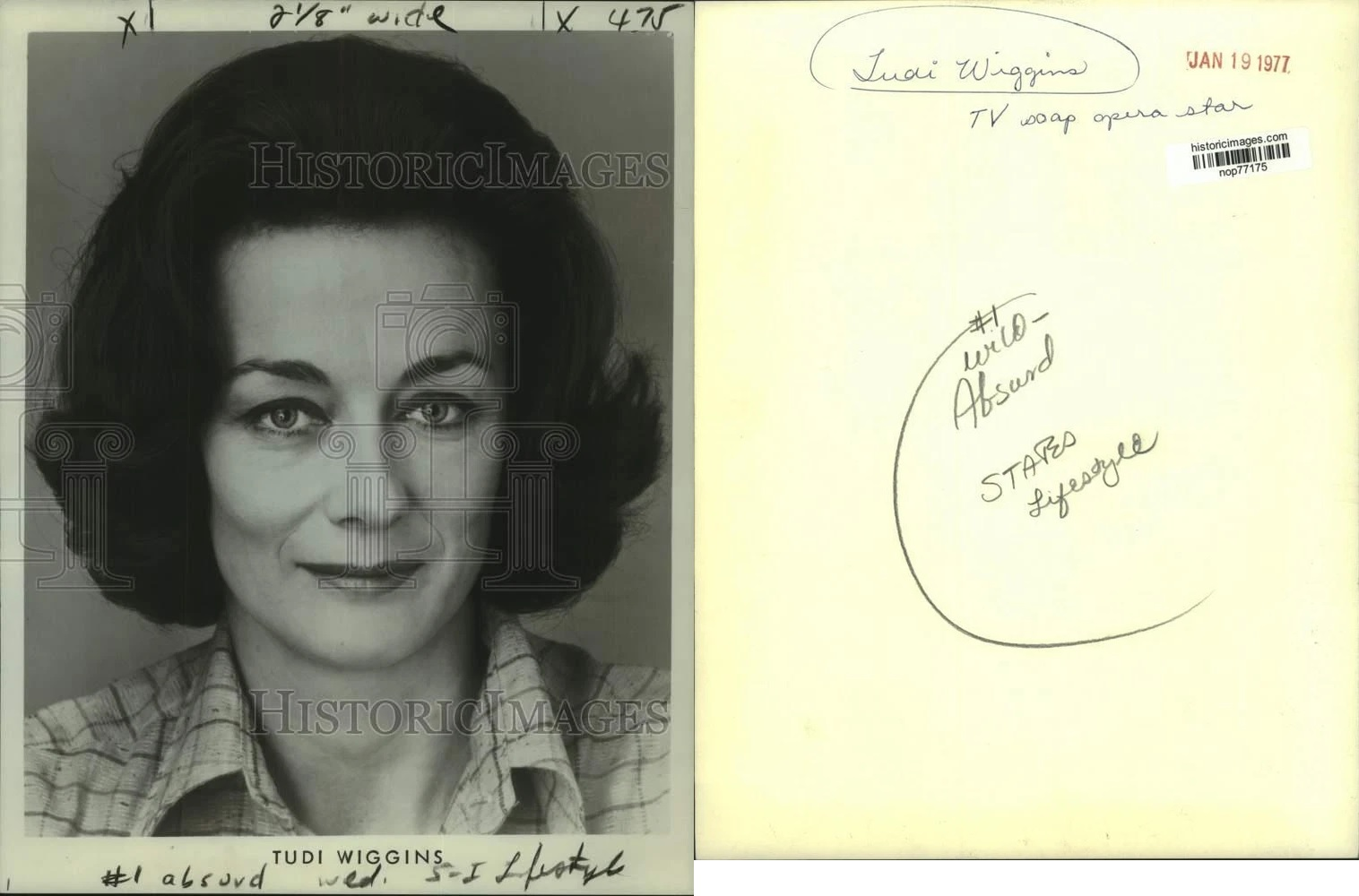
- Wiggins in 1977
- Born: Mary Susan Wiggins; October 10, 1935; Victoria, British Columbia, Canada
- Died: July 19, 2006 (aged 70); Gouverneur, New York, US
- Occupation: Actress
- Years active: 1950s–1989

Tudi Wiggins (October 10, 1935 – July 19, 2006) was a Canadian actress. She was known for her work in television soap operas

Born Mary Susan Wiggins, in Victoria, British Columbia, she played the roles of Erica Desmond/Helena Raleigh in Strange Paradise (1969–1970), Karen Martin on Guiding Light (1971–1972), Meg Dale on Love of Life (1974–1980), and Sarah Kingsley on All My Children (1981–1982). In 1977 she appeared as a panelist on five episodes of the game show Match Game.

In later years, Wiggins produced, directed, and starred in her own talk show on WTZA-TV in Kingston, New York.

In 1989, she retired from the entertainment industry and moved to Fowler, New York.

During her retirement, in the nearby Gouverneur, New York, area, she became a caregiver to the elderly and infirm with Health Services of Northern New York and the Community Development Program.

Mary Susan "Tudi" Wiggins died of cancer Wednesday, July 19, 2006, at E.J. Noble Hospital, Gouverneur, New York. She was 70. She never married.

== Filmography ==
=== Film ===
Film
Year	Title	Role	Notes
1966	Once Upon a Prime Time	Mrs. Lavinia Smudge	Short film
1966	A Question of Identity: War of 1812		Short film
1969	My Side of the Mountain	Miss Turner	
1971	Hot Pants Holiday	Jill	
1985	Hot Resort	Sarah	
1988	Monkey Shines	Esther Fry	Final film role

=== Television ===
Television
Year	Title	Role	Notes
1958-1959	The Unforeseen		2 episodes
1960	General Motors Theatre	Celia Lang	Also known as CBC Theatre, Encounter, Ford Television Theatre, and General Motors Presents; 2 episodes
1961	Festival		Season 1, episode 23: "The Pupil"
1961	Summer Circuit		Miniseries; Episode 1: "Chesley and the South Seas"
1962	Playdate	Anna	Season 1, episode 15: "That Gold Belongs to Uncle Angus"
1967	The Mystery Maker		
1969	Yesterday and Today	Martha Scott	
1969-1970	Strange Paradise	Erica Desmond / Helena Raleigh	28 episodes
1971-1972	Paul Bernard, Psychiatrist	Mrs. Howard	
1971 or 1972	Guiding Light	Karen Martin	
1973	Dr. Simon Locke	Kay Bishop	Also known as Police Surgeon; Season 3, episode 21: "House Guest"
1975-1980	Love of Life	Meg Hart	8 episodes
1977	Match Game	Herself	Panelist; 5 episodes
1981	The Great Detective		Season 3, episode 3: "Sins of the Fathers"
1981	Standing Room Only	Mrs. Witherspoon	Special: Freddie the Freeloader's Christmas Dinner; Special also known as Red Skelton's Christmas Dinner
1981-1982	All My Children	Sarah Kingsley	5 episodes; 1 credit only
1984	He's Fired, She's Hired	Wheezy Knowlton	TV movie
1985	Brass	Mrs. Amory	Final television role TV movie
