= Shelley Hack =

American actress

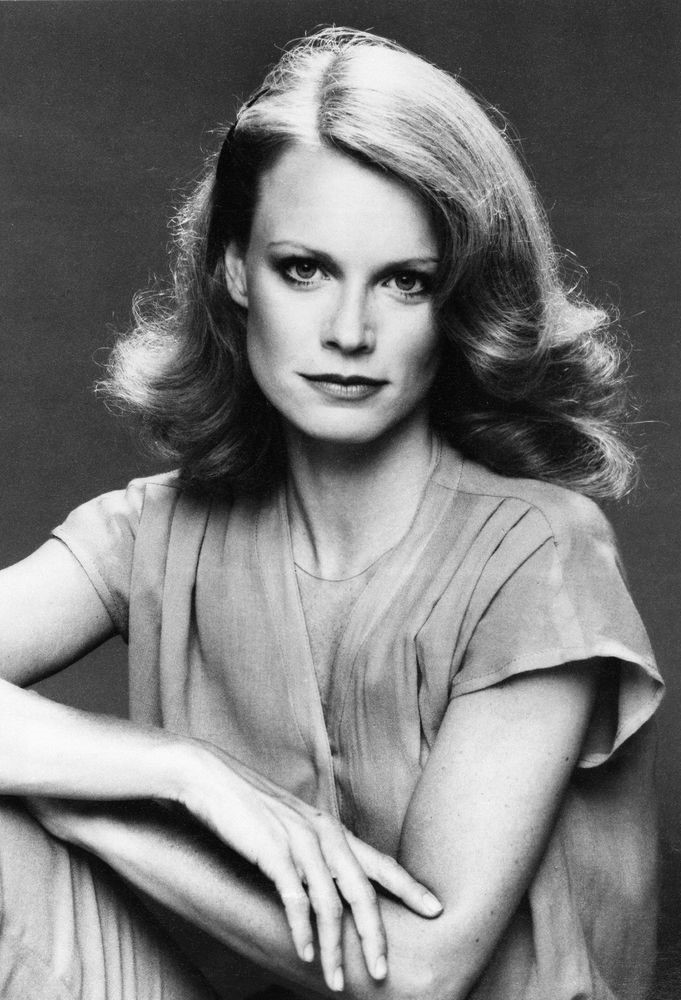
- Studio portrait (1979)
- Born: Shelley Marie Hack; July 6, 1947 (age 79); White Plains, NY, U.S.
- Education: Smith College (AB); New York Institute of Technology (MBA)
- Occupations: Actress; model; producer; political activist
- Years active: 1975–present
- Known for: Charlie's Angels; Annie Hall; Jack and Mike; The King of Comedy; Troll; The Stepfather
- Spouse: Harry Winer (m. 1990)
- Children: 1

Shelley Marie Hack (born July 6, 1947) is an American actress, model, producer, and political activist. She is best known as the face of Revlon's Charlie perfume from the mid-1970s until the early 1980s, and for her role as Tiffany Welles in the fourth season of Charlie's Angels (1979–80).

== Early life ==
Hack was born in Greenwich, Connecticut on July 6, 1947, the eldest of six children. Her father was a Wall Street financial analyst, and her mother was a former Conover model. She graduated from Greenwich Academy and Smith College, where she spent her junior year studying archeology at the University of Sydney.

== Career ==
Hack began her career as a teen fashion model whose first job put her on the cover of Glamour magazine. Later she became the face of Revlon's "Charlie" perfume from the mid-1970s until the early 1980s, during which it became the world's top selling fragrance. Life proclaimed her one of the "million-dollar faces" in the beauty industry; select models who were able to negotiate previously unheard-of lucrative and exclusive deals with giant cosmetics companies, were instantly recognizable, and whose names became known to the general public. Hack ranked among a handful of 1970s "supermodels".

Hack's feature-film debut was a bit part in Woody Allen's Academy Award-winning film Annie Hall (1977) as "Street Stranger." She had a leading role in the Joe Brooks romance drama, If Ever I See You Again ("A bomb", she admitted).

Shortly thereafter she was cast as Kate Jackson's replacement on the television series Charlie's Angels, playing the sophisticated character Tiffany Welles for one season (1979–1980). She beat out many competitors for the role, including Michelle Pfeiffer and Barbara Bach. Although there was an initial rise in the ratings (her debut episode was number one in the weekly Nielsen ratings), they began to decline. Responding to the fallen ratings, ABC released Hack from her contract in February 1980.

A statement later issued by Spelling-Goldberg read: "When she signed her contract for the series, Miss Hack had a personal agreement that she could review her continuation with the show at the end of her first season since series television represented an enormous change in her career and lifestyle. In case Miss Hack decides not to come back next season on a regular basis, she has agreed to do several guest-star appearances on the show." " This implied that Hack was included in the decision to exit Charlie's Angels. In an interview with People magazine, Hack said, "They can say I didn't work out, but it isn't true. What happened was a network war. A business decision was made. Change the timeslot or bring on some new publicity. How to get publicity? A new Angel hunt. Who is the obvious person to replace? I am — the new kid on the block. I was supposed to play the 'Intelligent College Girl from the East' [but] maybe that type didn't fit into Charlie's Angels." Hack later said she "never expected to be there more than a year and I wasn't. I did my year and I moved on."

Post Charlie's Angels, Hack played a variety of starring and supporting roles. She starred with Annette O'Toole and Meredith Baxter Birney in Vanities (1981), a television production of the comedy-drama stage play about the lives, loves and friendship of three Texas cheerleaders starting from high school to post-college graduation; it aired as a part of Standing Room Only, a series on the premium-television channel HBO.

She received positive reviews for her portrayal of Cathy Long in Martin Scorsese's film The King of Comedy (1983). She had leading roles in two cult films: the comedy-horror film, Troll (1986) and the horror film The Stepfather (1987). She was also a regular on two short-lived TV series of the 1980s, Cutter to Houston (1983) and Jack and Mike (1986–87). In addition to several more notable appearances in film and television and on stage, she narrated the audiobook The Lord of Hawkfell Island, for which AudioFile stated "Shelley Hack's mellifluous voice brings this Viking tale alive."

In 1984, Hack was hired to replace Paula Kelly and portray new public defender Christine Sullivan - who was going to be romantically involved with Judge Harry Stone (Harry Anderson) - on the sitcom Night Court, But when the series started rehearsals, Hack and producer Reinhold Weege realized there was a problem. "What happened was the role was changed, Instead of being a funny lady, as she was in the reading, they had changed her into a straight woman. It wasn't working, The concept just didn't work and that's what I told them...what's the point if it's not working?" Hack and the producer mutually and amicably agreed she would not continue with the series. Ellen Foley was brought in for season two as a new character, public defender Billie Young. In season three Markie Post was hired to portray Christine Sullivan.

In 1987, Hack, a former smoker, was named the national chairperson for the National Lung Association's and American Medical Association's campaign to educate young women on the dangers of cigarette smoking. With an emphasis on her relatable persona and leveraging her status as a global style icon and model, during her time as chairperson, Hack’s focus was to counter tobacco marketing that associated smoking with independence, glamour, success, and slimness.

Hack completed a master's degree in business administration from New York Institute of Technology and shortly afterward (unofficially) retired from acting.

In October 2000, appearing as herself, Hack returned to the Charlie's Angels Townsend Agency office as a guest host on Biography, which featured profiles of several Charlie's Angels stars during '"Hello Angels Week". In January 2008, Hack appeared on The Oprah Winfrey Show in the episode, "Classic Americana", that highlighted Hack as Revlon's Charlie perfume model in a 1976 television ad with Bobby Short at the piano. "It was a time when women were changing," Hack said. "Women looked at [the ad] and said, 'I want to be like that'." Additionally, referring to the Revlon Charlie commercials and Charlie's Angels, she said, "I was lucky. There were two things I was in that were about making women feel a little more empowered."

Hack and her husband Harry Winer are co-presidents of the production company Smash Media, which develops and produces content for motion pictures, television and new media.

== Activism ==
Shelley Hack became a voting registration and polling station supervisor in the 1997 elections in Bosnia-Herzegovina and produced the first-ever televised presidential debates there as well. She also produced the debates in Sarajevo, Mostar, and the two in Banja Luka. In 1997, Hack founded the Shelley Hack Media Consultancy (SHMC), where, over the course of ten years, she worked with the largest media conglomerate in Eastern Europe, primarily focused on the television sector, creating ethnically diverse television programs in Eastern Europe. She established herself as a media consultant for pre- and post-conflict countries. Among her duties was to help spread independent media such as newspapers, radio and television, citing the fact that with autocratic governments, the population is often fed state television, which delivers biased content. Additionally, she became a member of the Pacific Council on International Policy (PCIP), which is an independent, non-partisan, membership-based organization dedicated to global engagement.

== Personal life ==
Hack has been married to film director and university professor Harry Winer since 1990. The couple have one child, daughter Devon Rose Winer (born 1990).

== Filmography ==
=== Film ===
Year	Title	Role	Notes
1977	Annie Hall	Street Stranger	
1978	If Ever I See You Again	Jennifer Corly	
1979	Time After Time	Docent	Narrator
1983	The King of Comedy	Cathy Long	
1986	Troll	Anne Potter	
1987	The Stepfather	Susan Maine	
1991	Blind Fear	Erika	
1992	The Finishing Touch	Hannah	
1992	Me Myself & I	Jennifer	
1996	House Arrest	Dr. Erica Gilliland, Ph.D.	Uncredited

=== Television ===
Year	Title	Role	Notes
1979	Married: The First Year	Linda	Episode: "An Old Friend"
1979	Death Car on the Freeway	Janette Clausen	Television film
1979–1980	Charlie's Angels	Tiffany Welles	Main role, 26 episodes
1980	The Love Boat	Carol Ketay	Segment: "Dumb Luck"
1981	HBO Standing Room Only (SRO)	Mary	Episode: "Vanities"
1981	Macy's Thanksgiving Day Parade	Herself	Float: "Charlie and the Nutcracker"
1982	The American Sportsman	Herself	Episode dated July 4, 1982
1983	Cutter to Houston	Dr. Beth Gilbert	9 episodes
1983	Found Money (aka My Secret Angel)	Leslie	Television film
1983	Trackdown: Finding the Goodbar Killer	Logan Gay	Television film
1983	Close Ties	Anna	Television film
1984	Single Bars, Single Women	Frankie	Television film
1985	Kicks (aka Destination Alcatraz)	Maggie Pierson	Television film
1986–1987	Jack and Mike	Jackie Shea	16 episodes
1988	Celebrity Chefs	Herself	Guest
1989	Bridesmaids	Kimberly	Television film
1990	Frederick Forsyth Presents	Monica Browne	Episode: "A Casualty of War"
1992	Taking Back My Life: The Nancy Ziegenmeyer Story	Nan Horvat	Television film
1993	seaQuest DSV	Capt. Marilyn Stark	Pilot/Episode: "To Be or Not to Be"
1993	Not in My Family	Becky Worth	Television film
1993	A Perry Mason Mystery: The Case of the Wicked Wives	Abby Walters-Morrison	Television film
1994	L.A. Law	Lynn Barnett	Episode: "Whose San Andreas Fault is it, Anyway?"
1994	Tales from the Crypt	Janet McKay	Episode: "The Assassin"
1995	Falling from the Sky: Flight 174 (aka Freefall: Flight 174)	Lynn Brown	Television film
1996	Frequent Flyer	JoBeth Rawlings	Television film
1997	Diagnosis Murder	Dr. Elaine Denell	Episode: "Looks Can Kill"
1997	TheraCel (Skin Care)	Herself	Infomercial
2000	Biography	Herself	5 Episodes: "Hello Angels Week"
2000	Time and Again (TV series): Charlie's Angels	Herself	Retrospective
2002	TV Tales: Charlie's Angels	Herself	Documentary
2008	The Oprah Winfrey Show	Herself	Episode: "Classic Americana"
2008	Whatever Happened To...?	Herself	Episode: "Alpha Females"
2017	The Real Mad Men of Advertising	Herself	Episode: The 1970s

=== Stage ===
Year	Title	Role
1981	Vanities	Mary
1982	Born Yesterday	Billie Dawn
1983	Close Ties	Anna
1989	Tamara	Luisa Baccara

=== Discography/Audio book ===
Year	Title	Role
1981	The First Family Rides Again	A voice on the phone
1993	The Big Book for Our Planet	Narrator
1993	Lord of Hawkfell Island (Viking Era, Book 2)	Narrator

=== Home video ===
Year	Title	Role
1990	The Celebrity Guide to Wine	Herself
1993	The Celebrity Guide to Entertaining	Herself

=== Production ===
Year	Title	Role	Notes
2011	Lucky Christmas	Producer	Television film
2015	Perfect Match	Producer	Television film
2016	Summer of Dreams	Producer	Television film
2017	Christmas in Evergreen	Producer	Television film
2017	A Bramble House Christmas	Producer	Television film
2018	Falling for You	Producer	Television film
