= Vanities (TV program) =

1981 drama about three Texas cheerleaders

- Written by: Jack Heifner
- Directed by: Norman Twain
- Starring: Annette O'Toole; Meredith Baxter Birney; Shelley Hack

Original release
- Network: HBO
- Release: March 15, 1981

Vanities is a HBO American television presentation of the comedy-drama stage production of the play of the same title written by Jack Heifner.

== Background ==
The television production premiered on HBO in March 1981 as part of the channel's Standing Room Only series. The story concerns the lives, loves and friendship of three Texas cheerleaders starting from high school to post college graduation. The television special starred Annette O'Toole, Meredith Baxter Birney and Shelley Hack as the threesome. The play was created by Jack Heifner.

The HBO presentation was one of several stage shows that aired on the premium network in the 1980s. Other HBO productions included Richard Harris in Camelot as well as Frank Langella in the title role as Sherlock Holmes.

The cast of Vanities on Home Box Office (HBO)

== Cast ==
- Annette O'Toole as Kathy
- Meredith Baxter Birney as Joanne
- Shelley Hack as Mary
