= The Watcher of Westfield, New Jersey =

Anonymous stalker in New Jersey, US

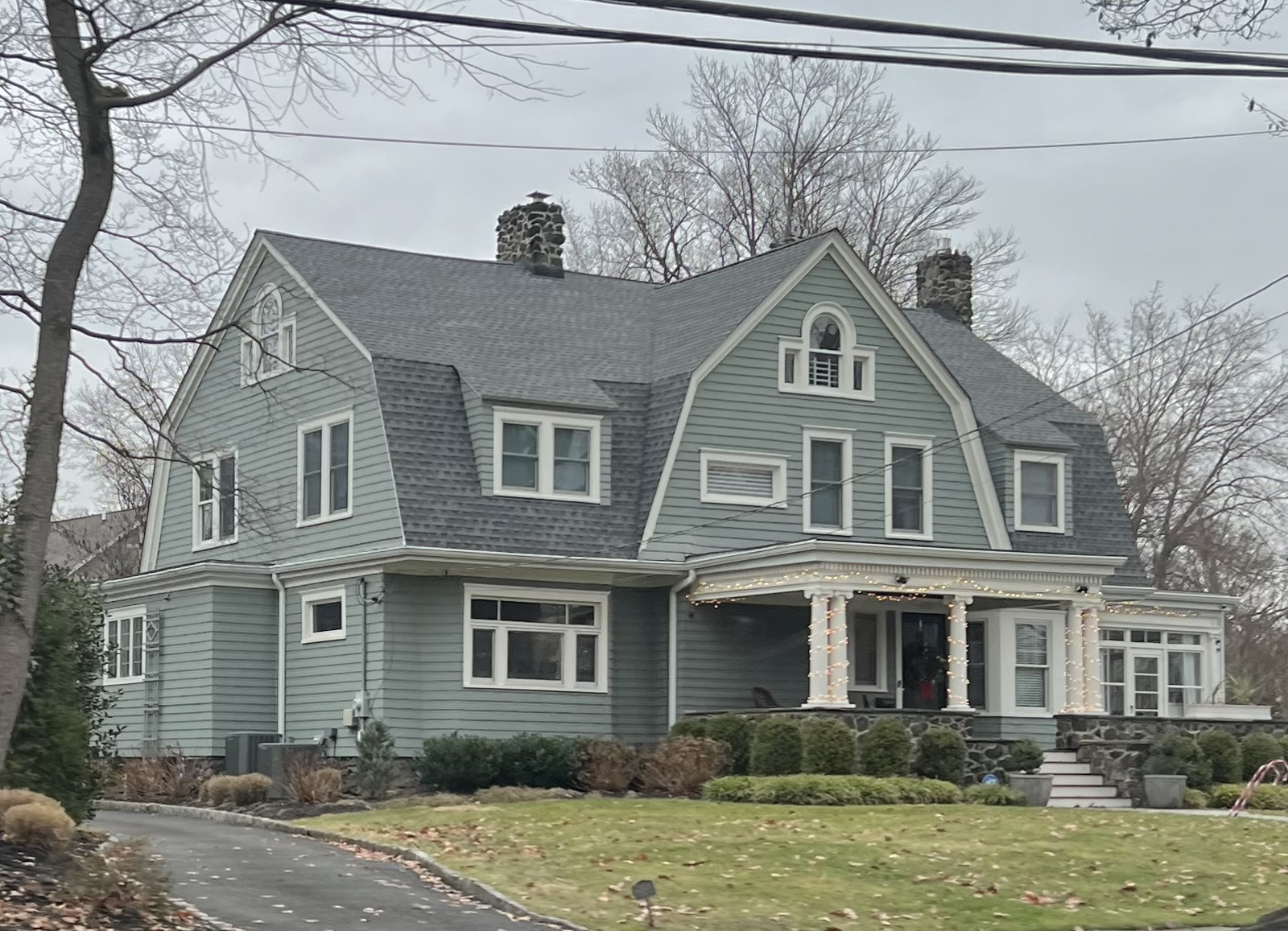
657 Boulevard, pictured in 2024

The Watcher of Westfield, New Jersey, is an unidentified person who stalked the owners of the house at 657 Boulevard in Westfield, New Jersey, United States, from 2014 to 2017. The individual sent them multiple harassing letters signed "The Watcher". The owners never moved in out of fear for their family's safety. In 2022, the Netflix series The Watcher debuted, based loosely on these events.

== Events ==
In June 2014, Derek and Maria Broaddus bought a six-bedroom house at 657 Boulevard in Westfield, New Jersey, for US$1.3 million. Shortly after closing but before moving in, the couple received the first of four anonymous typewritten letters. The letter writer said that his or her family had been "watching" the house for generations and revealed knowledge of the Broadduses' three young children—referred to in the letter as "new blood"—as well as the house's layout and renovations.

Over the following weeks, the Broadduses received more letters, the messages becoming increasingly disturbing, referencing past owners, their children, and claiming a pseudo-spiritual connection to the house. One letter read, in part:

657 Boulevard is anxious for you to move in. It has been years and years since the young blood ruled the hallways of the house...Who am I? I am the Watcher and have been in control of 657 Boulevard for the better part of two decades now...I pass by many times a day. 657 Boulevard is my job, my life, my obsession. And now you are too Braddus [sic] family. Welcome to the product of your greed! Greed is what brought the past three families to 657 Boulevard and now it has brought you to me. Have a happy moving in day. You know I will be watching.

The Broadduses contacted the Westfield Police Department, who initially focused on the Langford family, longtime neighbors who lived next door, but found no evidence linking them to the letters. DNA recovered from an envelope suggested the sender may have been a woman, but did not match any suspects. Private investigators and former FBI agents were also unable to identify the author. Some members of the community became skeptical of the Broadduses' account, speculating that the letters may have been a hoax. The letters became increasingly threatening, and in 2019, the Broadduses, who never moved into the house, sold it for $959,000. The young couple who bought the house from the Broadduses have not been contacted by the Watcher.

The letters were considered well-written and literary, though their typographical errors may suggest a writer with erratic tendencies. The Watcher's identity remains unknown, and no charges have ever been filed in connection with the case.

== In media ==
The 2017 Australian horror film 3rd Night was inspired by the events of the Watcher case. In 2022, The Watcher, starring Naomi Watts and Bobby Cannavale, debuted on Netflix, and was inspired by the real events. On the show, the family's name is Brannock, as the Broadduses had requested their surname not be used. The producers also gave the family two children instead of three, and made them older than their real-life counterparts.
