= The Albertans =

Canadian television series

- Genre: Drama
- Written by: Lyal Brown
- Directed by: Ron Weyman
- Starring: Albert Angus; George Clutesi; Anne Collinge; Frances Hyland; Leslie Nielsen
- Country of origin: Canada
- Original language: English
- No. of seasons: 1
- No. of episodes: 3

Production
- Executive producer: Stanley Colbert
- Producer: John Trent

Original release
- Network: CBC Television
- Release: 14 January – 28 January 1979

The Albertans is a Canadian drama television miniseries that aired on CBC Television in 1979.

== Premise ==
The drama resembled a Canadian version of Dallas, with the plot involving the cattle ranching and petroleum industries, eco-terrorism, and First Nations land claims.

== Cast ==
- Albert Angus as Johnny
- George Clutesi as Isaac, Johnny's grandfather, an aboriginal
- Anne Collinge as Clair, Carl Hardin's daughter-in-law
- Frances Hyland as Marjanne, Carl Hardin's daughter
- Leslie Nielsen as Don MacIntosh, a petroleum industrialist
- Daniel Pilon as Hans Keller, a German businessman, involved with Clair
- Gary Reineke as Peter Wallen, a construction company operator
- George Waight as Carl Hardin, a former rancher

== Scheduling ==
Three hour-long episodes were broadcast on Sundays 9:00 p.m. (Eastern) from 14 to 28 January 1979.
