= Freddie the Freeloader's Christmas Dinner =

1981 Home Box Office special

- 1981 HBO Program Guide artwork for Freddie the Freeloader's Christmas Dinner
- Created by: Red Skelton
- Written by: Red Skelton
- Directed by: John Trent
- Starring: Red Skelton; Vincent Price; Imogene Coca
- Composers: Red Skelton; Ian Bernard
- Country of origin: United States

Production
- Producer: Riff Markowitz
- Running time: 50 minutes
- Production company: Home Box Office

Original release
- Network: HBO
- Release: December 13, 1981

Freddie the Freeloader's Christmas Dinner (aka Red Skelton's Christmas Dinner) is a TV special that premiered on Home Box Office (HBO) on December 13, 1981. The program stars Red Skelton and was part of HBO's Standing Room Only series of specials. This was one of Skelton's final television performances.

== Plot ==
Freddie the Freeloader prepares to scrape together money and enjoy a Christmas dinner with his equally poverty-stricken friend Professor Humperdo at one of New York's fancy restaurants. When a lost dog appears in his apartment, he is accused of thievery by his wealthy owner. After a meeting with the bag lady Molly, he visits a hospital and entertains some children for Christmas. Freddie busts the professor out of the drunk tank and the two eventually reach the restaurant - and treat themselves to a feast.

The special includes drama, miming, and music, for which Skelton was noted. Songs sung by Skelton in this special include "Christmas Comes But Once a Year" and "I Believe".

== Main cast ==
- Red Skelton as Freddie the Freeloader
- Vincent Price as Professor Humperdo
- Imogene Coca as Molly, a bag lady
- Jack Duffy as Santa
- Tudi Wiggins as Mrs. Witherspoon

== See also ==
- Standing Room Only
- On Location
