= Jack and Mike =

- Genre: Comedy drama
- Created by: Sara Davidson
- Starring: Shelley Hack; Tom Mason
- Composer: Nan Schwartz
- Country of origin: United States
- Original language: English
- No. of seasons: 1
- No. of episodes: 16

Production
- Executive producer: David Gerber
- Running time: 60 minutes
- Production companies: David Gerber Productions; MGM Television

Original release
- Network: ABC
- Release: September 16, 1986 – March 24, 1987

Jack and Mike is an American comedy-drama television series created by Sara Davidson that originally aired on ABC from September 16, 1986 to March 24, 1987.

== Premise ==
Shelley Hack plays Jackie, a newspaper columnist. Tom Mason plays her husband Mike, a restaurant owner who operates two of Chicago's trendiest clubs. Their careers often interfere with one another.

== Cast ==
- Shelley Hack as Jackie Shea
- Tom Mason as Mike Brennan
- Jacqueline Brookes as Nora Adler
- Kevin Dunn as Anthony Kubacek
- Vincent Baggetta as Rick Scotti
- Diana Petersen as Scotti's girlfriend
- Nouelle Bou-Sliman as Belinda
- Carol Rossen as Charlotte
- Mills Watson as Max

== Episodes ==
No.	Title	Directed by	Written by	Original release date
1	"Pilot"	Jack Bender	Sara Davidson	September 16, 1986
Jack defends a man who claims he was wrongly accused of rape. Mike is stressed about the opening of a new restaurant. This was a 90 minute episode, later reran on cable channels like Encore Action as a TV movie.
2	"Change of Heart"	Jack Bender	Joe S Landon	September 23, 1986
Jackie thinks a patient waiting for a heart transplant may have been passed on the list by a man who donated a lot of money to the hospital. A friend of Mike's come to stay at the house.
3	"Personal Foul"	Victor Lobl	Mitch Paradise	September 30, 1986
A college professor is suspended when he tries to flunk the star player of the basketball team. Tom doesn't like that Jackie is covering the story, because it's his alma mater.
4	"Ready or Not"	Harry Winer	Liz Coe	October 21, 1986
Jackie is pregnant; she's also making her exclusive column about a 14-year fugitive who wants to come clean which becomes challenging. Mike deals with the changes a baby will cause in their careers while dealing with investors in his restaurant. Jackie outsmarts the fugitive's secret plan to evade justice.
5	"High Anxiety"	Paul Stanley	Gina Goldman	November 11, 1986
A young comedian is suspected to have died of a cocaine overdose behind Mike's restaurant.
6	"Cry Uncle"	Kim Friedman	Harry and Renee Longstreet	November 18, 1986
Mike finds out that the 15-year-old boy he has been looking after is actually a missing child.
7	"Mentor"	Peter Crane	Unknown	November 25, 1986
A college teacher admired by Jackie is cited for contempt of court when he refuses to reveal his sources.
8	"Taste of Chicago"	Victor Lobl	Max Eisenberg	December 9, 1986
Mike gets an offer he can't refuse from the mayor's office. Jackie gets an exclusive interview with a man who has been in prison for 30 years.
9	"Separate Lives"	Paul Stanley	Unknown	January 6, 1987
Jackie goes to New York City for a job interview, but she ultimately stays in Chicago.
10	"Come Together"	Peter Crane	David Braff, Gina Goldman	January 13, 1987
Jackie and Mike have a difficult time after their separation.
11	"Charity Ball"	Paul Stanley	Braff, Eisenberg, Goldman	January 20, 1987
Jackie looks into the odd behavior of a wealthy sorority sister. A friend of Mike's dies of a heart attack.
12	"Till Death Do Us Part"	Jan Eliasberg	Unknown	February 3, 1987
Mike wants to get a shotgun for protection. Jackie keeps getting calls from a psychotic secret admirer.
13	"Fire and Ice"	Lee David Zlotoff	Lee David Zlotoff	February 24, 1987
A drug kingpin wants to become partners with Mike in the restaurant business.
14	"Light My Fire"	Paul Krasny	Unknown	March 3, 1987
A time capsule is opened prematurely and secrets are revealed.
15	"Dreamland"	Victor Lobl	Unknown	March 17, 1987
Jackie is pressured into dropping the investigation of a dance studio that has been swindling elderly women out of their money.
16	"Reluctant Hero"	Unknown	Unknown	March 24, 1987
A mystery man saves the life of a young boy.
