= Ladybugs (film) =

- Theatrical release poster
- Directed by: Sidney J. Furie
- Written by: Curtis Burch
- Produced by: Andre Morgan; Albert S. Ruddy
- Starring: Rodney Dangerfield; Jackée; Jonathan Brandis; Ilene Graff; Vinessa Shaw
- Cinematography: Dan Burstall
- Edited by: Timothy Board; John W. Wheeler
- Music by: Richard Gibbs
- Production company: Ladybugs Productions
- Distributed by: Paramount Pictures (United States); Morgan Creek Productions (international)
- Release date: March 27, 1992
- Running time: 90 minutes
- Country: United States
- Language: English
- Budget: $20 million
- Box office: $14.8 million (US)

Ladybugs is a 1992 American sports-comedy film starring Rodney Dangerfield and directed by Sidney J. Furie. Dangerfield plays a Denver businessman who takes over a girls' soccer team sponsored by the company that employs him. The film also stars Jackée Harry as his assistant coach, Ilene Graff as his girlfriend, Jonathan Brandis as his girlfriend's son, and Vinessa Shaw as his boss's daughter.

Then Los Angeles Dodgers manager Tommy Lasorda has a cameo, as do Blake Clark and longtime Dangerfield friend Chuck McCann.

== Plot ==
Chester Lee is desperate for a promotion at work. Craving respect from his boss, he fabricates a story of having been an excellent soccer player in his youth. Consequently, he gets badgered into coaching a girls' soccer team the company sponsors, called the Ladybugs. With his assistant Julie along as assistant coach, Chester imagines the task will be easy since the Ladybugs are a dynasty, having dominated previous seasons, and believes getting the team to a championship will get him the promotion. However, only one player has returned for the new season. The rest of the team has never played soccer before and the girls, including the boss's daughter, Kimberly, are clueless. After a dreadful start to the season, Chester has no idea how to improve the team. His boss gives him an ultimatum to start winning before he returns from vacation.

Chester's fiancee Bess a son named Matthew from a previous marriage who is a great soccer player. Poor grades and neglecting his homework got him kicked off the team. Chester admits to Matthew he knows nothing about soccer, and begs him for help. When Matthew watches the Ladybugs practice, Chester decides to dress him as a girl and play on the team under the alias "Martha." Matthew's crush on Kimberly helps convince him to agree. Only Chester and Julie know Martha's secret identity.

In his first game Matthew as Martha plays selfishly then quits the team. Chester, deflated, is ready to admit to Bess he lied about being promoted, afraid it will ruin their engagement. Feeling bad for Chester, Matthew reconsiders. Chester teaches Matthew how to act more polite and ladylike, and they go dress shopping together. During the next game, Matthew is a better teammate. He changes the coach's lineup, passes to his teammates, and encourages them while they score goals. Chester wants to take a player named Penny out, but Matthew wants to give her another chance. A motivated Penny dribbles the ball and assists a goal. They win the game, and the team celebrates with "Martha."

Although the team is playing well, Kimberly still struggles with her confidence, and Chester's boss demands Chester remove her from the team. "Martha" comforts Kimberly, who decides to pay her new friend a surprise visit at home. Matthew switches into his Martha costume, but when his mom and Chester arrive, he rushes back into his normal appearance to greet them and secretly explain the problem to Chester. "Martha" successfully lures Kimberly out of the house, but then runs into his mom who sees him in the dress and wig. When Matthew explains, Bess is furious at Chester for involving her son in his scheme. Chester and Matthew show up for the championship game in low spirits.

They decide they can't use Martha anymore if they want a chance at Bess forgiving Chester. Matthew hears that Kimberly's dad forced her to stay home, so he goes to her house to show her that he is Martha and bring her to the game. Chester informs the Ladybugs they'll be playing without Martha. Their low morale causes them to trail 3–0 by halftime. Matthew reveals his true identity to the rest of his teammates. His honesty fires the team up and they bounce back. Kimberly scores the winning goal on a penalty kick and the team celebrates.

Chester gets his promotion, Bess and Chester marry, and Matthew and Kimberly begin dating. Chester manages the company's girls' softball team, consisting of boys in wigs since his boss thought the cheating was innovative. After his boss congratulates him on his career and marriage, Chester says to the audience, "I finally got some respect!"

== Cast ==
- Rodney Dangerfield as Coach Chester Lee
- Jackée Harry as Julie Benson
- Jonathan Brandis as Matthew/Martha
- Ilene Graff as Bess
- Vinessa Shaw as Kimberly Mullen
- Tom Parks as Dave Mullen
- Randall May as Championship Soccer trainer
- Jeanetta Arnette as Glynnis Mullen
- Crystal Cooke as Nancy Larimer (as LaCrystal Cooke)
- Jennifer Frances Lee as Carmelita Chu
- Vanessa Monique Rossel as Tina Velez
- Johna Stewart-Bowden as Sally Anne Welfelt (as Johna Stewart)
- Jandi Swanson as Penny Pester
- Nancy Parsons as Coach Annie
- Blake Clark as Coach Bull
- Tommy Lasorda as Coach Cannoli

== Production ==
Sidney J. Furie became involved with directing Ladybugs when producer Andre Morgan, who'd previously worked with Furie as a producer on The Boys in Company C, told Furie of a project he and Albert S. Ruddy were working on that was similar in concept to The Bad News Bears. Furie accepted the directing job more out of a desire to work than anything else and claimed it was one of the best paid jobs he'd ever had working in the industry. For the casting of the character of Matthew, both Jonathan Brandis and Leonardo DiCaprio auditioned for the role, with the producers ultimately deciding to go with Brandis as DiCaprio looked too convincing in drag, which they felt killed the joke.

Shooting took place from July through September 1991 in and around Denver, Colorado.

== Release ==
Paramount struggled with how to market the film and considered changing the title, as it clashed with Dangerfield's image as a profane comic. The film grossed almost US$15 million in the US and Canada, while Warner Bros. Pictures and Morgan Creek International obtained the foreign distribution rights.

== Reception ==
Ladybugs was panned by critics. On Rotten Tomatoes holds an approval rating of 14% with an average rating of 3.9/10, based on 21 reviews. Metacritic, which uses a weighted average, assigned the film a score of 36 out of 100, based on 9 critics, indicating "generally unfavorable" reviews. Audiences however polled by CinemaScore gave the film an average grade of "A−" on an A+ to F scale.

Michael Wilmington of the Los Angeles Times wrote that the film flip-flops on its themes and "has the stale, slick, worked-over look of standard studio product". Vincent Canby of The New York Times wrote: "Even when the material is feeble, as it is here, Mr. Dangerfield can sometimes be funny."

== See also ==
- List of association football films
