= Lost in Yonkers (film) =

1993 American film

- Theatrical release poster
- Directed by: Martha Coolidge
- Written by: Neil Simon
- Based on: Lost in Yonkers by Neil Simon
- Produced by: Ray Stark
- Starring: Richard Dreyfuss; Mercedes Ruehl; Irene Worth; David Strathairn
- Cinematography: Johnny E. Jensen; A. Troy Thomas
- Edited by: Steven Cohen
- Music by: Elmer Bernstein
- Production company: Rastar
- Distributed by: Columbia Pictures
- Release date: May 14, 1993 (United States)
- Running time: 114 minutes
- Country: United States
- Language: English
- Budget: $15 million
- Box office: $9 million

Lost in Yonkers is a 1993 American film adaptation of Neil Simon's 1991 Pulitzer Prize-winning play of the same name, directed by Martha Coolidge. It stars Irene Worth, Mercedes Ruehl, and Richard Dreyfuss.

== Plot ==
In 1942, following the death of their mother, 15-year-old Jay Kurnitz and his 13-year-old brother Arty move from the Bronx to Yonkers to live temporarily with their strict, stern Grandma Kurnitz and her daughter Aunt Bella, so that their father Eddie can take a traveling sales job and pay off his late wife's medical debt. Grandma's harsh upbringing of her own children has estranged all of them but Bella, who has the mind and emotions of a child despite being in her mid-30s. Grandma, whom Eddie has avoided visiting and who did not get along with his now-deceased wife, at first refuses to take in the boys, but Bella is happy to see them and uncharacteristically stands up to Grandma, threatening to move out into "the home" for those with mental conditions and leave Grandma all alone if she doesn't let the boys stay.

Jay and Arty do not enjoy living under Grandma's strict rules. Upon learning from Bella that Grandma has hidden $15,000 somewhere in the house and attached candy store, the boys try to find it so they can pay off their father's debt and he can return home. Meanwhile, the boys' Uncle Louie, a mobster, returns to his mother's house to hide from another mobster, Hollywood Harry, who is stalking him hoping to get what Louie has in a black bag. Louie responded to Grandma's harsh upbringing by becoming tough and independent, and starting a life of thievery and crime at a young age. Louie encourages the boys to have similar "moxie", but also reveals to them that Grandma herself was traumatized at age 12, when she saw police kill her father and was herself permanently disabled in the ensuing riot. As a result, Grandma believes people must be "like steel" in order to simply survive.

Bella has fallen in love with Johnny, the head usher at the local movie house, who like her is mentally slow and lives with his parents. Bella and Johnny plan to get married and open their own restaurant, for which they need $5000, which Bella hopes to convince Grandma to give her. After agonizing about how to discuss this with Grandma, Bella announces it at a family dinner attended by Louie and their sister Gert, whose fear of Grandma caused her to develop a speech impediment. Grandma disapproves of the match, causing Bella to break down crying and leave the house, moving in with Gert. That night, Jay helps Louie steal Hollywood Harry's car and escape with the black bag. Louie later calls Bella to tell her he's now the "richest guy in Guadalcanal."

Bella now has $5000 (later revealed to have been given to her by Louie) but discovers that Johnny is too afraid to marry her or open a restaurant. She returns to Grandma's house where they have an emotional confrontation. Grandma's stern harshness is shown to be her reaction to not only her own childhood trauma, but also grief from the deaths of her husband and two of her children at young ages. Bella agrees to move back in with Grandma on the condition that Bella will lead a more independent life. Eddie returns from his business travels and reclaims his sons, who leave Grandma a loving farewell card. In the final scene of the film (which implies, but does not explicitly show, Grandma's death), Bella leaves Yonkers for good and sends Eddie and the boys a postcard from Florida, where she has gotten a restaurant job.

== Cast ==
- Richard Dreyfuss as Louie
- Mercedes Ruehl as Bella
- Irene Worth as Grandma
- Mike Damus as Arty
- Brad Stoll as Jay
- David Strathairn as Johnny
- Robert Guy Miranda as Hollywood Harry
- Jack Laufer as Eddie
- Susan Merson as Gert
- Illya Haase as Harry's Crony

== Broadway play ==
After eleven previews, the Broadway production, directed by Gene Saks, opened on February 21, 1991, at the Richard Rodgers Theatre, where it ran for 780 performances. The original cast included Jamie Marsh, Irene Worth, Mercedes Ruehl, and Kevin Spacey.

== Reception ==
The film holds a score of 71% on Rotten Tomatoes, based on 17 reviews. Audiences surveyed by CinemaScore gave the film a grade of "B+" on scale of A+ to F. It was the last film to use the 1981-1993 Columbia Pictures logo.

Roger Ebert gave the film three stars out of four and wrote, "All of the performances are good, but one of them, by Mercedes Ruehl, casts a glow over the entire film." Gene Siskel of the Chicago Tribune awarded two-and-a-half stars out of four and wrote, "A wonderful play about a classically unhappy household that has been turned into a typical, mechanical Neil Simon joke machine. Simon's stage words rarely transfer well to the more realistic arena of film, and this is no exception. Another liability is that Richard Dreyfuss hams his way through a role that was played with dignity and poignancy on stage by Kevin Spacey." Janet Maslin of The New York Times described the film as "sometimes more picturesque than powerful. But it conveys all the warmth and color of the original material." Todd McCarthy of Variety wrote "Story of a domineering old woman's tyranny over two generations of offspring is adroitly structured and contains strong human elements, but what proved so affecting onstage seems a bit pat and calculated when viewed in closeup." Peter Rainer of the Los Angeles Times described the film as "essentially deep-dish Neil Simon, which is, after all, not so very deep. But neither is the play negligible; it has a felt, melancholy undertow, and Ruehl and Worth, who both won Tonys for their performances on Broadway, bring out its full, racking sadness." Peter Travers of Rolling Stone wrote "In the film version, with Ruehl and Worth repeating their Tony-winning roles, Simon intensifies the barrage of belly laughs and bathos. Director Martha Coolidge, whose Rambling Rose was a model of graceful literary adaptation, seems at a loss with the crass material."
