= Susan Merson =

American actress (1950)

- Born: April 25, 1950; Detroit, Michigan, U.S.
- Occupation: Actress
- Years active: 1974–present
- Website: susanmerson.com

Susan Merson (April 25, 1950) is an American actress, producer, author and playwright, known for her roles as Lorraine in Grey's Anatomy, Tammy in The Watcher and Lucy in Life Goes On, and such films as Lost in Yonkers, Tootsie and Terminator 3: Rise of the Machines. Merson has performed in the Broadway productions of Zefirelli’s Saturday Sunday Monday and Children of a Lesser God. She has founded and co-founded several production companies such as New Dramatists, Manhattan Theatre Club, Lion Theatre and the O'Neill Theatre Center.

== Life and career ==
Merson was born April 25, 1950 in Detroit, Michigan and graduated from Boston University. She co-founded the Off-Broadway Lion Theatre Company while working with stage director Garland Wright.

Merson originated the role of Maria in the Broadway production of Eduardo De Filippo's play Saturday Sunday Monday, which opened at the Martin Beck Theatre on November 21, 1974; directed by Franco Zeffirelli. In 1976, Merson created and starred in one of the longest running Off-Broadway musicals, Vanities, alongside Kathy Bates and Jane Galloway. It opened on March 22, 1976 at Playwrights Horizons and closed May 27, 1979, running for 1,313 performances.

As an acting teacher, Merson founded the Los Angeles and New York Writers Bloc; and taught playwriting for ten years at Cal State Fullerton. She is credited in saving the 13th Street Repertory Theatre by presenting plays and workshops featuring women writers and performers.

An an actor, Merson has starred in several television shows and films, including, Lost in Yonkers, Tootsie, Grey’s Anatomy, Life Goes On, and The Watcher.

== Filmography ==
Year	Film	Role
2024	The Last Night in the Life of Death	Macbeth
2015	Freeheld	Harriet
2009	‘Me, You, a Bag & Bamboo	Chun Li’s Mother
2005	The Prize Winner of Defiance, Ohio	Mrs. Bidlack
2004	Young Artie Feldman	Artie’s Mom
2003	Terminator 3: Rise of the Machines	Roadhouse Clubgoer #1
1996	Phenomenon	nurse
1995	Things to Do in Denver When You're Dead	Woman with Cancer
1993	Lost in Yonkers	Gert
1982	Tootsie	Page
1980	Times Square	Nurse May

== Television ==
Year	Film	Role	Notes
2022	The Watcher	Tammy	3 episodes
2022	Scandal	Judge Thompson	1 episode
2009	Grey’s Anatomy	Lorraine	2 episode
2008	True Blood	Woman in Booth	1 episode
2008	Monk	Mrs. Sheckman	1 episode
2005	Surface	Gov’t Panel Suit #3	1 episode
2005	Numb3rs	Brenda Aronson	1 episode
2004	Without a Trace	Sheila	1 episode
2004	Meltdown	Attorney General Zultrow	TV Movie
2002	Six Feet Under	Realtor	1 episode
2002	The Practice	Mrs. Green	1 episode
2001	NYPD Blue	Pam Del Porto	1 episode
2001	A Family in Crisis: The Elian Gonzales Story	Janet Reno	TV Movie
1999	Frasier	Woman in Cafe	1 episode
1999	Net Force	Senator Dondridge	TV Movie
1998	Party of Five	Airplane Woman	1 episode
1998	Ally McBeal	Judge Stoller	1 episode
1998	Profiler	Violet Preston	1 episode
1996	Dangerous Minds	Norma Joelson	1 episode
1996	Murder One	Caller (voice)	1 episode
1995	Picket Fences	EMS Leader	1 episode
1995	ER	Mrs. Blum	1 episode
1995	The Watched	Rulenska	1 episode
1994	Models Inc.	Dr. Alicia Bentson	2 episodes
1993	Reasonable Doubts	Rose Stepke	2 episodes
1992	L.A. Law	Dr. Elise Neiman	1 episodes
1991	Absolute Strangers	Dr. Natalie Kay	TV Movie
1991	Equal Justice	Catherine Abbott	1 episode
1990	The Trials of Rosie O'Neill	Harriet Meyer	1 episode
1990	Life Goes On	Lucy	3 episodes
1990	Gabriel's Fire	Dr. Rayne	1 episode
1990	The Operation	Bank VP	TV Movie
1989	Family Matters	Sylvia	1 episode
1988	Thirtysomething	Admissions Nurse	1 episode
1986	Hill Street Blues	Resident	1 episode
1985	St. Elsewhere	Dr. Gail Perry	1 episode

== Published works ==
- Mersont, Susan (March 3, 2021). When They Go and You Do Not: A Blog and Plays about Dying and Coming Back to Life. Merson. ASIN B08XYJM5RK.
- Mersont, Susan (March 3, 2021). Dreaming in Daylight. Merson. ASIN B08XYK7DBQ.
- Mersont, Susan (February 1, 2021). Oh Good Now This. Merson. ASIN B08RCXVNTX.
- Mersont, Susan (February 4, 2023). How We Saw the Moon. Merson. ASIN B0BTRKN7Y4.
