= 3rd Night =

2017 film directed by Adam Graveley

- Film poster
- Directed by: Adam Graveley
- Written by: Adam Graveley
- Produced by: Dion Borrett
- Starring: Jesse McGinn; Robert Hartburn; Bruce Denny
- Cinematography: Daniel Holliday
- Music by: Tim Count
- Release date: August 26, 2017 (Horror Channel FrightFest)
- Running time: 72 minutes
- Country: Australia
- Language: English

3rd Night is an Australian horror film directed and written by Adam Graveley and starring Jesse McGinn, Robert Hartburn, and Bruce Denny.

== Plot ==
The film follows Meagan and Jonathan, a married couple who have moved from the city to the country, where they have purchased an orchard farmhouse. Immediately after moving in the couple begin to experience a series of disturbing events. As the events grow in severity, an unknown figure begins to stalk both the couple as well as a pair of hunters who have been squatting on the property in order to hunt rabbits, as part of the region's culling season. This figure, identified as The Watcher, has been slaying people for an indeterminate amount of time. As the film progresses The Watcher murders the squatters as well as Jonathan, leaving only Meagan alive. The film ends with The Watcher attacking Meagan off-screen, presumably killing her.

== Cast ==
- Jesse McGinn as Meagan Reid
- Robert Hartburn as Jonathan Reid
- Bruce Denny as Cambo
- Connor Gosatti as Rex
- Rose McKenna as Deidre Bodeen

== Production ==
When writing the script Graveley was inspired by the story of The Watcher of Westfield, New Jersey. He was also inspired by the filming location, the Longvalley Orchard in Jarrahdale, Western Australia. Of the location, Graveley stated that "We wanted to create a sense of unease and creepiness so using the natural bushland around the orchard was the perfect setting."

== Release ==
3rd Night had its world premiere on 26 August 2017 at FrightFest.

== Reception ==
Anton Bitel reviewed the film for SciFiNow, stating that the film "plays a familiar game in a mostly familiar way, but makes the most of its outback setting and (largely) nocturnal camerawork to conjure a sense of feral menace." PopHorror's Jennifer Bonges also reviewed the film, stating that it exceeded her expectations and that it was "a well constructed film with a chilling setting of the isolated outback and solid performances to back that up."
