= Betty Broderick =

American murderer (1947–2026)

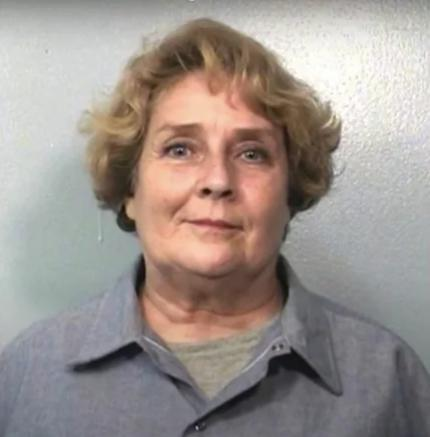
- Broderick in 2011
- Born: Elisabeth Anne Bisceglia; November 7, 1947; New York City, U.S.
- Died: May 8, 2026 (aged 78); Chino, California, U.S.
- Spouse: Dan Broderick (m. 1969; div. 1989)
- Children: 5
- Conviction: Second-degree murder (2 counts) violation of PC 187(a)
- Penalty: 32 years to life in prison

Details
- Victims: Daniel Broderick III; Linda Broderick
- Killed: 2
- Imprisoned at: California Institution for Women

Elisabeth Anne "Betty" Broderick (née Bisceglia; November 7, 1947 – May 8, 2026) was an American woman who murdered her ex-husband, Dan Broderick and his succeeding wife, Linda, on November 5, 1989. The motive for the murders was revenge after Daniel had, Betty claimed, cheated on her during their marriage, and then divorced her. Her first trial ended with a hung jury, and at a second trial that began on December 11, 1991, she was convicted of two counts of second-degree murder and sentenced to 32 years to life in prison.

The case received extensive media attention. Several books were written on the Broderick case and a television film was broadcast in two parts. In 2020, an eight-episode miniseries was produced and shown about Broderick.

== Early life ==
Betty Broderick was born Elisabeth Anne Bisceglia, (Note: Broderick changed the form of her first name from "Elizabeth" to "Elisabeth" after having taken a French class later on.) on November 7, 1947, and grew up in Bronxville, New York. She was the third of six children born to Marita (née Curtin; 1919–2007) and Frank Bisceglia (1915–1998), who owned a successful plastering business with relatives. Her mother was Irish American and her father was Italian American.

The Bisceglias were strict parents and much was expected of all the Bisceglia children. As Broderick later recalled, she was being trained to be a housewife since the day she was born, or as she recalled: "Go to Catholic schools, be careful with dating until you find a Catholic man, support him while he works, be blessed in your later years with beautiful grandchildren." She recalled that her school friends were raised under similar circumstances, giving her little chance to rebel.

Broderick attended Maria Regina High School, in Hartsdale, New York, and graduated from Eastchester High School, in Eastchester, New York, in 1965. She graduated from the College of Mount Saint Vincent, in the Bronx, where she earned a degree in early childhood education through an accelerated program. Her credits also earned her a minor in English.

== Engagement and marriage ==
In 1965, Elisabeth (Betty) met her future husband, Dan Broderick (1944–1989), at the University of Notre Dame in Indiana. Dan was born in Pittsburgh, Pennsylvania, the eldest son of a very large Irish Catholic family, whose parents had a similar outlook to the Bisceglias'. Dan and Betty met at a dance at Notre Dame. At 17 years old, she was pursuing her degree at the College of Saint Mary, and he was a 21-year-old senior about to graduate from Notre Dame and attend Cornell Medical School.

In her self-published autobiography several years after her murder conviction, Betty described the beginning of their relationship as

"Dan never once wavered from his goal of making me his wife. He would wait, he would do and say whatever was necessary, even agreeing with me when he didn't, and doing things I wanted to do when he didn't, until he had me. Nobody ever used the terms 'obsessive-compulsive' or 'stalker' back then, but that is what he was."

The couple married on April 12, 1969, at the Immaculate Conception Church in Tuckahoe, New York. Betty returned from the honeymoon pregnant with their first child, a daughter named Kim (born 1970). She gave birth to four more children: daughter Lee (born 1971), sons Daniel (born 1976) and Rhett (born 1979), and an unnamed boy who died four days after birth.

== Marriage breakdown ==
Shortly after the birth of their first child, Dan completed his M.D. degree at Cornell in 1970. He then announced his intention to combine his medical expertise with a J.D. degree and enrolled at Harvard Law School. Betty was the main provider for the family while Dan attended law school with the help of a student loan. After graduating in 1973, Dan was quickly hired by the largest law firm in San Diego, California, which had a substantial defense litigation practice, and moved his family to the San Diego community of La Jolla.

Betty continued working part-time, often selling Tupperware or Avon products, while raising the children. In 1978, after five years of substantial defense litigation work and training as an associate, Dan left the large firm where he was well regarded. He then founded his own small boutique law firm, specializing in medical malpractice litigation on behalf of plaintiffs. Because of Dan's background as both an M.D. and trial attorney, the firm quickly enjoyed success.

In the fall of 1982, Dan hired 21-year-old Linda Kolkena (1961–1989) as his legal assistant at his new firm. As early as October 1983, Betty suspected that Dan was having an affair with Linda, but Dan denied it. Against Betty's wishes, Dan moved out in February 1985. He eventually took custody of their children after Betty left the children on his doorstep one by one. Betty claimed that Dan confessed he had, in fact, been having an affair with Linda and a drawn-out, hostile divorce ensued.

By this time, Dan Broderick had become a prominent local attorney, serving as the president of the San Diego Bar Association. Betty claimed that Dan made it extremely difficult for her to find an attorney willing to represent her in the divorce, which put her at a distinct disadvantage. Betty also believed that Dan used his legal influence to win sole custody of their children, sell their house against her wishes, and cheat her out of her rightful share of his income. The divorce was finalized in 1989, four years after Dan filed the petition.

Betty Broderick's behavior became increasingly erratic. She left hundreds of profane messages on Dan's answering machine and ignored numerous restraining orders that forbade her from setting foot on Dan's property. She vandalized his new home and even drove her car into his front door, despite the fact that their children were inside the house at the time.

On April 22, 1989, Dan and Linda were married. Linda had been concerned about Betty's behavior and even urged Dan to wear a bulletproof vest at their wedding. Dan refused to do so, although plain-clothes security was employed. However, Betty did not attend the wedding and it proceeded without incident. After the wedding, Betty Broderick claimed that Linda taunted her by mailing her facial cream and slimming treatment ads.

== Murders ==
One month before Dan and Linda's wedding, Betty purchased a Smith & Wesson revolver. Early one morning, seven months after Dan and Linda were married, Betty Broderick drove to Dan's house at 1041 Cypress Avenue in the Marston Hills neighborhood, near Balboa Park in San Diego. Betty had taken a key to the house from her daughter Kim. She entered the house while the couple were asleep and shot and killed them.

The murders occurred at 5:30 a.m. on November 5, 1989. Two bullets hit Linda in the head and chest, killing her instantly. One bullet hit Dan in the chest as he was apparently reaching for the phone. One bullet hit the wall and one bullet hit a nightstand. Dan was 44 years old and Linda was 28 years old.

Evidence presented at trial indicated that Betty had removed a phone from Dan Broderick's bedroom so that he could not call for help. Medical evidence indicated that Dan had not died immediately. Betty claimed that she had spoken to him after shooting him. After contacting her daughter, Lee, and Lee's boyfriend, Betty turned herself in to police, never denying that she had pulled the trigger. At both trials, Betty claimed that she never planned to kill Dan and Linda and that her crime was not premeditated. Her account of the murders at her second trial was that she was startled by Linda screaming "Call the police!" and immediately fired the gun.

Linda and Dan Broderick are listed as having been buried together, at Greenwood Memorial Park, in San Diego.

== Trials and imprisonment ==
Criminal defense attorney Jack Early represented Broderick at trial. Kerry Wells prosecuted for the State of California. Broderick's defense claimed that she was a battered wife driven over the edge by years of psychological, physical, and mental abuse inflicted by her ex-husband. Wells portrayed Broderick as a murderer who planned and schemed to kill her ex-husband, arguing that Broderick was not a battered woman.

The prosecution's forensic psychiatrist and criminologist, Dr. Park Dietz, used the analysis of Dr. Melvin Goldzband, who had previously worked on the case. Dietz testified that Broderick had histrionic and narcissistic personality disorders, stating that Goldzband had described her as "severely narcissistic" and "histrionic". Clinical psychologist Katherine DiFrancesca, testifying for the defense, similarly concluded Broderick was "histrionic" with "narcissistic features".

The lead detective in the case was Terry DeGelder of San Diego Homicide, who provided testimony for the prosecution.

Broderick's first trial ended with a hung jury when two of the jurors held out for manslaughter, citing lack of intent. A mistrial was declared by Judge Thomas J. Whelan. Betty Broderick was re-tried a year later with the same defense attorney and prosecutor. The second trial was, essentially, a redux of the first. At the conclusion of the second trial, the jury returned a verdict of guilty on two counts of second-degree murder.

Broderick was sentenced to two consecutive terms of 15 years to life, the maximum sentence under the law, plus two years for the illegal use of a firearm. She was incarcerated from the day she committed the murders until her death in 2026.

At the time of her death, Broderick was serving her sentence at the California Institution for Women (CIW) in Chino, California. In January 2010, her first request for parole was denied by the Board of Parole Hearings because she neither showed remorse nor acknowledged wrongdoing. She was again denied parole in January 2017. She would not have been eligible for parole again until January 2032, when she would have been 84 years old.

== In popular culture ==
An article about Broderick's case in the Los Angeles Times Magazine led to the production of a television film called (Part 1) A Woman Scorned: The Betty Broderick Story, and (Part 2) Her Final Fury: Betty Broderick, The Last Chapter (1992), where Meredith Baxter portrayed Betty, Stephen Collins portrayed Dan, and Michelle Johnson portrayed Linda Kolkena. Baxter received nominations for both an Emmy Award and an American Television Award for her portrayals of Broderick. The murder was dramatized in the season 4 episode of Deadly Women, titled "Till Death Do Us Part".

Both before and after Broderick's trials, her story was dramatized across the United States. Broderick herself also granted numerous television and magazine interviews. She appeared on The Oprah Winfrey Show, Hard Copy, 20/20, and Headliners and Legends.

At least five books were written about her story:

- Until the Twelfth of Never: The Deadly Divorce of Dan and Betty Broderick, 1993, by Bella Stumbo
- Until the Twelfth of Never - Should Betty Broderick ever be free?, 2013, by Bella Stumbo
- Forsaking All Others: The Real Betty Broderick Story, 1993, by Loretta Schwartz-Nobel
- Hell Hath No Fury, 1992, by Bryna Taubman
- She Gave Her Pearls, 2023, by Kimberly Dotseth

Broderick was interviewed by Ladies Home Journal magazine and other media outlets.

The 1991 Law & Order episode "The Wages of Love" was partially inspired by the murders and the trial that followed. Guest star Shirley Knight was nominated for a Primetime Emmy Award for Outstanding Lead Actress in a Drama Series.

Karen Kilgariff covered the case in episode 103 of My Favorite Murder, recorded live in San Diego.

In a 2017 episode of Murder Made Me Famous titled "Betty Broderick", she was portrayed by actress Holly Day. Dan Broderick is portrayed by actor Chad Halbrook and Linda Broderick was portrayed by actress Valerie Lamb.

The 2020 second season of the TV series Dirty John features the story of Betty and Dan Broderick, from the early years through the homicides. Amanda Peet plays Betty and Christian Slater plays Dan.

In spring 2020, a true crime podcast about the Betty Broderick case was produced by the Los Angeles Times titled It Was Simple: The Betty Broderick Murders.

On July 15, 2020, Oxygen aired a special episode of Snapped devoted to the Betty Broderick case.

== Civil litigation ==
Apart from the notable criminal case, Betty Broderick was involved in several civil court cases, including wrongful death for the murder of Dan Broderick and his wife Linda and Broderick's own lawsuits against the County of San Diego.

== Death ==
On May 8, 2026, Broderick died of natural causes at the age of 78 while in the custody of the California Department of Corrections and Rehabilitation. On April 18, she had been transferred from the California Institution for Women to a specialized medical facility in Chino, California, for a higher level of care following a fall that resulted in broken ribs and subsequent septic infections. According to her children, she was surrounded by family at the time of her death. At the time of her passing, she was serving a sentence of 32 years to life and had been denied parole twice, with her next eligibility date originally scheduled for 2032.
