= The Mystery Maker =

Canadian children's drama television series

- Genre: Children's television
- Written by: Lyn Cook
- Country of origin: Canada
- Original language: English
- No. of seasons: 1
- No. of episodes: 13

Production
- Producer: Bill Glenn
- Production location: Stratford, Ontario
- Running time: 30 minutes

Original release
- Network: CBC Television
- Release: 6 January – 31 March 1967

The Mystery Maker is a Canadian children's drama television series that aired on CBC Television in 1967.

== Plot ==
The plot is set in Stratford, Ontario at a boarding house owned by Mrs. O'Hara (Ruth Springford), a widow. Her teenage daughter Pegeen (Kathy Kastner) is an aspiring actress. Each episode features elements of mystery involving the O'Hara's and residents of the boarding house.

== Cast ==
- Kathy Kastner as Pegeen O'Hara
- Ruth Springford as Mrs. O'Hara
- James Edmond as Mr. Pudd
- Frances Hyland as a boarding house employee
- Syme Jago as Andy
- Alan Jordan
- Beth Lockerbie as Mrs. Hodge
- Jane Mallett
- Miles MacNamara as David
- Charles Palmer as Mr. Toby
- Joseph Shaw as Mr. B
- Tudi Wiggins

== Production ==
This series was recorded on location in Stratford. Stories were adapted by Lyn Cook from her novel Pegeen and the Pilgrim.

== Scheduling ==
This half-hour series was broadcast on Fridays at 4:30 p.m. (Eastern time) from 6 January to 31 March 1967.
