= Bridesmaids (1989 film) =

1989 television film directed by Lila Garrett

- Genre: Comedy; Drama
- Written by: Bett Eyre
- Directed by: Lila Garrett
- Starring: Shelley Hack; Sela Ward; Stephanie Faracy
- Music by: Paul Chihara
- Country of origin: United States
- Original language: English

Production
- Executive producer: Suzanne De Passe
- Producer: Jay Benson
- Production location: California
- Cinematography: Steve Yaconelli
- Editor: Richard Bracken
- Running time: 120 minutes
- Production companies: Deaun Productions; RHI Entertainment; Robert Halmi Productions

Original release
- Network: CBS
- Release: February 21, 1989

Bridesmaids is an American drama film, written by Bett Eyre, directed by Lila Garrett, starring Shelley Hack, Brooke Adams, Audra Lindley, Jack Coleman and Sela Ward. This film was aired on CBS on February 21, 1989.

== Plot ==
Four women who were once best friends during high school reunite after twenty years of estrangement to attend the wedding of their fifth friend. During their reunion, they reminisce about their school days, share long-held secrets, and uncover unexpected truths about their past. As they explore the town and reconnect with one another, they confront personal challenges, gain a deeper understanding of their lives, and gradually rebuild their friendship, emerging stronger and happier together.

== Cast ==
- Shelley Hack as Kimberly
- Sela Ward as Caryl
- Stephanie Faracy as Beth
- Brooke Adams as Pat
- Jack Coleman as Matt
- Audra Lindley as Lulu
- Hamilton Camp as Ridgefield
- James F. Dean as Officer John
- Randy Ser as Clerk
- Kathryn Kimler as Teen Driver
