= Jandi Swanson =

American actress

- Occupations: Actress; producer
- Years active: 1987–1998
- Known for: Baywatch, Ladybugs
- Notable work: Ladybugs

Jandi Swanson is an American actress and producer, most recognizable for her role as Jenny Drake in the first season of Baywatch, and as Penny Pester in the 1992 film Ladybugs.

== Filmography ==
- 2003 – I Love Your Work as Eager Fan
- 1998 – Beverly Hills, 90210 – Mouse (guest role)
- 1994 – Roseanne: An Unauthorized Biography – Brandi
- 1992 – Her Final Fury: Betty Broderick, the Last Chapter (TV)
- 1992 – Ladybugs – Penny Pester
- 1992 – A Woman Scorned: The Betty Broderick Story (TV)
- 1991 – American Eyes (TV) – Rico
- 1990 – The Golden Girls – young Dorothy (guest role)
- 1989 – Baywatch – Jenny Drake
- 1988 – Pumpkinhead – Wallace kid
- 1988 – Star Trek: The Next Generation – Katie (guest role)
- 1988 – L.A. Law – Katie Seaver (guest role)
- 1988 – Full House – Karen (guest role)
- 1987 – Matlock – Wendy Crowley (guest role)
- 1987 – Less than Zero – Jenny
