= The Watcher (2022 TV series) =

American television series

- Genre: Horror; Mystery thriller
- Created by: Ryan Murphy; Ian Brennan
- Based on: "The Haunting of a Dream House" by Reeves Wiedeman
- Starring: Naomi Watts; Bobby Cannavale; Isabel Gravitt; Luke David Blumm; Jennifer Coolidge; Margo Martindale; Richard Kind; Mia Farrow; Terry Kinney; Christopher McDonald; Noma Dumezweni; Joe Mantello; Henry Hunter Hall
- Composers: Morgan Kibby; David Klotz
- No. of seasons: 1
- No. of episodes: 7

Production
- Executive producers: Ryan Murphy; Ian Brennan; Alexis Martin Woodall; Eric Kovtun; Bryan Unkeless; Eric Newman; Paris Barclay; Naomi Watts; Ariel Schulman; Henry Joost; Scoop Wasserstein; Crystle Roberson Dorsey; Nissa Diederich; Karl Frankenfield; Scott Robertson; Todd Kubrak; Tanase Popa
- Producers: Todd Nenninger; Lou Eyrich; Todd Kubrak; Danielle Wang
- Cinematography: Jason McCormick; Maceo Bishop; Stanley Fernandez
- Editors: Lisa Trulli; Franzis Müller; Danielle Wang; Travis Weaver; Regis Kimble
- Running time: 44–52 minutes
- Production company: Ryan Murphy Productions

Original release
- Network: Netflix
- Release: October 13, 2022 – present

The Watcher is an American mystery horror television series created by Ryan Murphy and Ian Brennan for Netflix. It premiered on October 13, 2022. It is loosely based on a 2018 article by The Cut about The Watcher of Westfield, New Jersey. Despite being conceived as a miniseries, The Watcher was renewed for a second season in November 2022.

== Premise ==
The series follows a married couple who, after moving into their dream home in a fictionalized version of Westfield, New Jersey, are harassed by creepy letters signed by a stalker who goes by the pseudonym "The Watcher".

== Cast and characters ==
=== Main ===
- Naomi Watts as Nora Brannock
- Bobby Cannavale as Dean Brannock
- Isabel Gravitt as Ellie Brannock
- Luke David Blumm as Carter Brannock
- Jennifer Coolidge as Karen Calhoun
- Margo Martindale as Maureen / Mo
- Richard Kind as Mitch
- Mia Farrow as Pearl Winslow
- Terry Kinney as Jasper Winslow
- Christopher McDonald as Det. Rourke Chamberland
- Noma Dumezweni as Theodora Birch
- Joe Mantello as William "Bill" Webster / John Graff
- Henry Hunter Hall as Dakota

=== Recurring ===
- Michael Nouri as Roger Kaplan
- Danny Garcia as Steve
- Seth Gabel as Andrew Pierce
- Susan Merson as Tammy
- Seth Barrish as Jack
- Michael Devine as Christopher
- Stephanie Kurtzuba as Helen Graff
- Matthew Del Negro as Darren Dunn
- Jeffrey Brooks as Police Officer
- Patricia Black as Marjorie
- Kate Skinner as Trish
- Anthony Bowden as Young Roger
- Pamela Dunlap as Carol Flanagan
- Brittany Bradford as Nina
- Jeff Hiller as Therapist

== Episodes ==
No.	Title	Directed by	Written by	Original release date
1	"Welcome, Friends"	Ryan Murphy	Ryan Murphy & Ian Brennan	October 13, 2022
The Brannock family, parents Nora and Dean, and kids Ellie and Carter arrive at 657 Boulevard to attend an open house. Nora meets an old friend, Karen, who is the realtor. After having a few odd experiences, the family decides to buy the house. However, Dean has to take out almost all of the family's savings to afford the home. Six weeks later, the family moves in. Ellie hears music from an empty room, and the family receives an ominous letter from "The Watcher," alluding to the possibility of him approaching Ellie and Carter at some point in the future. Dean and Nora go to the police, but Detective Chamberland believes the whole thing is a prank. However, he agrees to send in the letter for DNA testing and says he knows the family "had to dig deep" to afford the house. The next morning, Carter finds Jasper, their neighbor, in the home's dumbwaiter. Pearl, Jasper's sister, explains that the old owners were okay with Jasper using the dumbwaiter. Dean and Nora decide to install alarms and cameras and hire Dakota, a 19-year-old entrepreneur. Later that night, Carter finds his pet ferret dead. A few mornings later, Dean finds another Watcher letter in the mail.
2	"Blood Sacrifice"	Paris Barclay	Ryan Murphy & Ian Brennan	October 13, 2022
Dean and Nora bring the second letter to Chamberland, who suggests hiring a private detective, and Dean employs Theodora Birch. Nora finds a motel for her and the kids to sleep in, and Dean stays at the house. The first night, the doorbell rings, but when Dean opens the door, there is no one, and Dean hears music from an upstairs room. At the motel, Nora gets a phone call and hears heavy breathing. After calling the number back, it is shown that the call came from inside the house. Later, Theodora gives Dean the contact information of Andrew Pierce, a previous owner. Dean meets with Andrew, who tells him his son Caleb went to their neighbors Mitch and Mo's house and saw men in cloaks drinking a baby's blood while living there. Andrew also received Watcher's letters shortly afterward and believes Mitch and Mo are the perpetrators. Dean and Nora hire Dakota as a night watch outside their house. That night, Dakota and Ellie kiss. The subsequent morning, Dean confronts Mo about the contractors. Dean is not made partner of the firm he works at, as he learns his boss gave the partnership offer to a younger colleague. Later, Dean wakes up to gunshots. The following morning, police find Mitch and Mo dead in their home.
3	"Götterdämmerung"	Ryan Murphy	Ryan Murphy & Ian Brennan	October 13, 2022
Dean continues to discuss the case with Theodora. It is still not clear who The Watcher could be. Nora discusses her troubled marriage with her friend, Karen, who suggests that the couple should have more sex. Later, Dean meets a man named John in his house, who claims to be the building inspector. Their conversation takes a weird turn. Afterward, Dean learns there is no building inspector in their area with that name. Nora tries to listen to Karen's advice, but Dean is too distracted because of what is going on in and around their new house. Dean is called by Theodora. She asked Chamberland if she could look at old files about the house. Doing so, she finds out about a family massacre committed by John Graff, a former owner who also received Watcher letters. Listening to her story, Dean thinks the man named John he met earlier might be John Graff. As Jasper Winslow discovered the bodies two weeks after the murders happened, Dean wants to confront him about the case, but Pearl will not allow it. Nora finds another letter from The Watcher.
4	"Someone to Watch Over Me"	Paris Barclay	Ryan Murphy & Ian Brennan	October 13, 2022
One week earlier, Dean and Nora confront the director of the real estate agency about the murders, but there is nothing he can do. Dean tells Nora and Theodora about the man called John he met earlier. However, Theodora doesn't see the connection and believes Dakota, who is dating Ellie, might be The Watcher. Dean finds out about it and confronts Ellie and Dakota, and Ellie calls the cops. Dakota agrees to send a sample of his DNA for testing to see if it matches the DNA on the Watcher envelopes. Ellie tells her dating story to her online followers, implying her father is racist as Dakota is a man of color. Dean finds out about a camera in their bedroom which films him asleep with a girl walking around the bed then lying next to him. She looks like Pat Graff, the daughter of John Graff. Dakota reveals he sent the footage to Nora and Dean's boss, and placed the camera in Dean's bedroom because he thought Dean was The Watcher. Nora saw the footage, and kicks Dean out of the house. Dean continues to keep watching out for them. He notices a car arriving, dropping off Mo and Mitch.
5	"Occam's Razor"	Jennifer Lynch	Ryan Murphy & Ian Brennan	October 13, 2022
While going through the phone records, Nora discovers the unknown motel call came from their home. Nora meets with Theodora, who hired a handwriting specialist to examine the letters and believes Dean is The Watcher. Theodora discovers Dean didn't make partner and got loans to pay for the house. Mo tells Nora her son planned to fake Mitch and Mo's death for insurance money. Pearl believes Jasper wrote the letters because she received a letter called "Ode to a House." Dakota searches the footage from all the cameras at the Brannock house and discovers the girl in Dean's bedroom never entered the home. Dean tells Nora he wrote the third letter. Karen tells Nora that an LLC wants to buy Nora's house, but Nora rejects the offer. The DNA results came back, which showed a woman's DNA was on the envelope. Nora sees Chamberland and Karen together at the country club, and she confronts them because she thinks the two were trying to get the house for cheap. Ellie discovers "Ode to a House" is a school assignment created by Roger Kaplan where students wrote a love letter to their favorite house. Nora recognizes Kaplan from the open house, and construction workers find a tunnel in the basement.
6	"The Gloaming"	Max Winkler	Ian Brennan & Reilly Smith	October 13, 2022
Dean and Nora chase a mysterious figure through the tunnel and reach a bedroom where someone had been living. The figure disappears behind a locked door, and is revealed to be John Graff. The two go to Chamberland, who refuses to help them after being confronted at the country club. Theodora goes to Trish, Roger's ex-wife, who tells her that Roger loved 657 Boulevard. He also loved another house and sent love letters to the owners. After a while, the letters became more threatening. Later, Dean and Nora confront Roger and his new wife, Miko, at the supermarket. The two accuse Roger of writing the Watcher letters, but Roger and Miko walk away. Angry, Roger stands outside the Brannock home, taunting them. Dean and Nora agree they need to sell the house. The Brannocks get a large offer, but the buyer backs out after an article about the home is published. Karen tells Nora she got the article published, and the Brannocks move back to their old house in the city.
7	"Haunting"	Jennifer Lynch	Ian Brennan & Reilly Smith & Todd Kubrak & Ryan Murphy	October 13, 2022
Nora's art pieces sell very well, and Dean is still obsessed with finding the perpetrator. Nora tells Theodora, who is in the hospital due to her terminal cancer, about Dean's obsession. Theodora later calls Dean to the hospital and tells him that she is The Watcher, and the Brannocks bought 657 Boulevard from her. After her divorce, she lost almost all her savings and was forced to sell the home. When Dean and Nora go to Theodora's funeral, her daughter tells them Theodora lied about being The Watcher so Dean could be at peace. The couple receive an LLC offer and sell the house. Karen is behind the LLC, and Nora visits Karen when she moves in, telling her that she "will be watching." Late at night, Karen finds a Watcher letter in the dumbwaiter, and goes downstairs to find her dog dead and a mysterious figure watching her. A few weeks later, Dean is in therapy, and tells his therapist that Karen sold the house. He goes back to the home and meets the new owner, introducing himself as John. He lies to Nora about where he is and drives home, not knowing that Nora is watching him.

== Production ==
Promotional poster

The series is based on a 2018 article for New York's "The Cut" by Reeves Wiedeman, which chronicled the experience of Derek and Maria Broaddus after they received threatening letters upon moving into their home at 657 Boulevard in Westfield, New Jersey in 2014, which continued until they sold the home in 2019. The character John Graff was based on John List, a mass murderer and longtime fugitive who murdered his family in his Westfield home in 1971. Similarities between John Graff's character and the List murders include his career as an accountant, attending a Lutheran church, and murdering his family members and live-in mother, along with leaving music playing in the house and planning an alibi that would cause the bodies to remain undiscovered for several weeks.

On-location scenes for the home at 657 Boulevard were filmed at a private residence in Rye, New York that was built in 2016. The scenes where the Brannock family stays at a motel were filmed at an operating motel located in the hamlet of Locust Valley on Long Island, New York.

While no scenes were filmed at the real-life 657 Boulevard residence in Westfield, the neighborhood received increased attention from visitors and fans following the release of the series; the home was guarded by police and barricade tape to prevent trespassers in October 2022.

In October 2026, it was reported that the production of the second season would begin in New York.

On October 22, 2026, Deadline announced that Owen Painter, Madelaine Petsch, Evan Adams, and Quintessa Swindell had joined Season 2 as series regulars.

== Reception ==
The review aggregator website Rotten Tomatoes reported a 56% approval rating with an average rating of 5.5/10, based on 34 critic reviews. The website's critics consensus reads, "This suburban nightmare sometimes achieves the campy fright of creator Ryan Murphy's best horror fare, but it sprawls in too many ludicrous directions to satisfy." Metacritic, which uses a weighted average, assigned a score of 54 out of 100 based on 8 critics, indicating "mixed or average reviews".

Daniel D'Addario of Variety summarized the show as "ultimately unremarkable fiction."
