= Frances Hyland =

Canadian stage, film and television actress

- Born: April 25, 1927; Shaunavon, Saskatchewan, Canada
- Died: July 11, 2004 (aged 77); Toronto, Ontario, Canada
- Occupation: Actress
- Children: Evan

Frances Hyland OC (April 25, 1927 – July 11, 2004) was a Canadian stage, film and television actress. She earned recognition for roles on stage (including ten seasons with Stratford Festival) and screen (including her performance as Nanny Louisa on Road to Avonlea). Honoured with the Governor General's Performing Arts Award in 1994, she was called "the first lady of Canadian theatre".

== Early life and education ==
Hyland was born in 1927 in Shaunavon, Saskatchewan, a small town south-west of Swift Current, to Jessie (née Worden), a teacher, and Thomas Hyland, a salesman. She lived there until her parents divorced when she was one year old. She was raised by her mother's family in Ogema, Saskatchewan. When she was seven, she moved to Regina when her parents tried, and failed, to save their marriage. She had no relationship with her father after 1937.

Hyland's dreams were clouded because her family did not have a great deal of money, but she always believed that she could achieve her dreams. As did her mother, who put herself through teacher's college in order to support her daughter's education and acting career.

Thus Hyland graduated in 1948 from the University of Saskatchewan with a BA in English. She earned a scholarship to and graduated from the prestigious Royal Academy of Dramatic Art (RADA) in London England where she won a silver medal for merit in passing her exams.

== Career ==
After graduating from the Royal Academy, Hyland remained in London, and made her professional debut on London's West End, starring as Stella in Tennessee William's acclaimed A Streetcar Named Desire.

In 1954, Hyland was invited by the renowned theatre director Tyrone Guthrie to open his first season of Canada's Stratford Festival, playing Isabella in Shakespeare's Measure for Measure. She went on to perform at the festival through the next ten seasons. Her roles included Portia (in The Merchant of Venice), Olivia (in Twelfth Night), Perdita (in The Winter's Tale), Desdemona (in Othello) and Ophelia opposite Christopher Plummer in an acclaimed production of Hamlet. As well, Hyland directed the Stratford Festival's 1979 production of Othello.

Hyland also performed with the Shaw Festival, the Crest Theatre in Toronto in The Living Room, and on Broadway (opposite Tony Perkins in Look Homeward, Angel).

On television, Hyland co-starred in the Canadian television series The Albertans and played Nanny Louisa on Road to Avonlea.

As the leading Shakespearean actress in Canada, Hyland also used her position to champion Canadian actors' campaign for higher status and pay.

Hyland married George McCowan, a fellow Canadian actor and director. They had a son, Evan, in 1957. The couple separated shortly after.

== Death ==
On Sunday, July 11, 2004, Hyland was admitted to St. Michael's Hospital in Toronto, Canada for respiratory failure from complications of a prior appendix surgery. She was pronounced deceased the following day by her son.

== Awards and honours ==
In 1970, Hyland was appointed an Officer of the Order of Canada. In 1994, Hyland received the Governor General's Performing Arts Award, Canada's highest honour in the performing arts, for her lifetime contribution to Canadian theatre.

== Filmography ==
=== Movies ===
Year	Title	Role	Notes
1963	Drylanders	Liza	
1966	Each Day That Comes		Short
1972	Another Smith for Paradise	Marie Smith	
1980	The Changeling	Mrs. Grey	
1980	The Hounds of Notre Dame	Mother Therese	
1981	Happy Birthday to Me	Mrs. Patterson	
1983	The Sight		Short
1993	The Lotus Eaters	Flora Kingswood	
1995	Never Talk to Strangers	Mrs. Slotnick	

=== Television ===
Year	Title	Role	Notes
1950–54	Sunday Night Theatre	Megan Owen / Sonia / Penelope Blessington	4 episodes: Deep Are the Roots, Adam's Apple, Crime and Punishment, The Gift
1955	Scope		1 Episode: Prelude to Marriage
1955	On Camera		1 Episode: The Queen's Ring
1955–61	Encounter	Nellie / Shevawn Flaherty / Melissa Turner	6 episodes
1957	Twelfth Night	Lady Olivia	TV movie
1957–59	Folio	Zuzushka / Mariana / Frances	3 episodes: Proud Passage, The Master of Santiago, Ivanov
1958	Till Death Do Us Part		1 Episode: Panic at Parth Bay
1959	Hudson's Bay	Susan Murray	1 Episode: Bosom Friends
1959–60	The Unforeseen	Martha	3 episodes: The Storm, The Wreath, Desire
1959–60	R.C.M.P.	Lucy Dodds / Mrs.Phillips	2 episodes: The Replacement, The Hunt
1960	Suspense	Ethel	1 Episode: Love Story
1960	Startime	Miss Miller / Catherine Stockmann	2 episodes: An Enemy of the People, An Enemy of the People
1960–62	Festival	Margot / Duchess / Olga	5 episodes
1962	First Person		1 Episode: My Home Is Here
1962	Salt of the Earth		TV movie
1961–62	Playdate	Ethel / Nellie Bancroft / Alice	3 episodes: The Salt of the Earth, The Vigilante, Love Story 1910
1967	The Mystery Maker		1 Episode
1973–80	The Beachcombers	Sadie	4 episodes: Sadie, Keep Your Shirt On, The Sasquatch Walks by Night, Sadie is a Lady
1974	The Naked Mind		1 Episode
1978	Catsplay	Mousey	TV movie
1978	Home to Stay	Aunt Martha	TV movie
1979	The Albertans	Marjanne Hardin	TV movie
1979	The Great Detective	Mrs. Eglantyne	1 Episode: Death Takes a Curtain Call
1980	Matt and Jenny	Martha Jane	1 Episode: A Woman's Place
1981	Tales of the Haunted	Dody	TV movie
1981	Titans	Elizabeth I.	1 Episode: Elizabeth I.
1983	Pygmalion	Mrs. Higgins	TV movie
1985	The Hearst and Davies Affair	Rose Duras	TV movie
1986	Kay O'Brien	Dr. Sarah McDonovan	1 Episode: Princess of the City
1987	Alfred Hitchcock Presents	Edith Ferris	1 Episode: The Impatient Patient
1988	Liberace: Behind the Music	Florence Bettray Kelly	TV movie
1988	The Twilight Zone	Laura Kincaid	1 Episode: Dream Me a Life
1988	Night Heat	Marie	1 Episode: No Regrets
1988	Lonely Knights	Maggie	TV movie
1989	Glory! Glory!	Velma	TV movie
1990	E.N.G.	Thelma	1 Episode: Division of Labour
1990–95	Avonlea	Nanny Louisa Banks	3 episodes: The Journey Begins, Sara's Homecoming, Comings and Goings
1993	Survive the Night		TV movie
1993	The Hidden Room	Rita	1 Episode: After the Crash
1993–94	Street Legal	Caroline Diamond	3 episodes: Thicker Than Water, Forgiveness, Persons Living or Dead
1994	Lonesome Dove	Clementine Coffey	1 Episode: Duty Bound
1994	Broken Lullaby	Maria	TV movie
1994	Tales from the Cryptkeeper	Aunt Melva	2 episodes: The Avenging Phantom/Myth Conceptions, The Haunted Mine
1994	Lives of Girls & Women	Aunt Grace	TV movie
1995	Due South	Fraser's Grandmother	1 Episode: Letting Go
1995	When the Dark Man Calls	Dr. Martha Petrie	TV movie
1996	Psi Factor: Chronicles of the Paranormal	Catherine Cartwright	1 Episode: Reptilian Revenge/Ghostly Voices
1996	Moonlight Becomes You	Nuala Moore	TV movie
1997	A Prayer in the Dark	Anna	TV movie
1997	I'll Be Home for Christmas	Thelma Jenkins	TV movie
