= A Woman Scorned: The Betty Broderick Story =

- Written by: Joe Cacaci
- Directed by: Dick Lowry
- Starring: Meredith Baxter; Stephen Collins; Michelle Johnson; Kelli Williams; Stephen Root; Lori Hallier
- Composer: Mark Snow
- Country of origin: United States
- Original language: English

Production
- Producers: Ann Kindberg; Dick Lowry
- Cinematography: Frank Beascoechea
- Editor: Anita Brandt Burgoyne
- Running time: Pt. 1 - 96 minutes Pt. 2 - 100 minutes
- Production companies: Lowry-Rawls Productions; Patchett Kaufman Entertainment; World International Network

Original release
- Network: CBS
- Release: March 1 – November 1, 1992

A Woman Scorned: The Betty Broderick Story is a 1992 American drama TV movie directed by Dick Lowry and written by Joe Cacaci. It chronicles the events of the true crime case of Betty Broderick murdering her ex-husband, Daniel, and his second wife, Linda, on November 5, 1989.

The film stars Meredith Baxter, Stephen Collins, Michelle Johnson, Kelli Williams, Stephen Root, and Lori Hallier. The film premiered in two parts. With part one releasing on CBS on March 1, 1992, while part two, titled Her Final Fury: Betty Broderick, the Last Chapter, premiered on November 1, 1992, eight months after its predecessor.

Baxter was nominated for the Primetime Emmy Award for Outstanding Lead Actress - Miniseries or a Movie for her performance.

== Plot ==
Betty Broderick is a homemaker and mother of four, happily married to her husband Dan for 16 years. When her husband suddenly leaves her for a younger woman named Linda, Betty feels betrayed and deceived. Her anger and grief skyrocket when Dan marries "the other woman" after a short time. In her madness and rage, Betty begins to insult, harass, and stalk her ex-husband, soon escalating to violence that eventually leads Broderick to kill both her ex-husband and the woman he left Betty for.

== Cast ==
- Meredith Baxter as Betty Broderick
- Stephen Collins as Dan Broderick
- Michelle Johnson as Linda Kolkena Broderick
- Kelli Williams as Kate Broderick
- Stephen Root as Kevin McDonald
- Lori Hallier as Joan
- Christine Jansen as Susan McDonald
- Debra Jo Rupp as Alice
- Tricia O'Neil as Margaret Fitzpatrick
- Ralph Bruneau as Larry Broderick
- Clayton Landey as Jerry
- Jandi Swanson as Debbie Broderick
- Jordan Christopher Michael as Tommy Broderick
- Aaron Freeman as Grant Broderick
- Anne Gee Byrd as Lois Marcos
- Susanna Thompson as Receptionist
- Richard Zavaglia as Judge Tamerlane
- Norman Large as Betty's Lawyer
- Thomas Kopache as Carl Fitzpatrick
- Joanna Sanchez as Josephina
- Jeff Allin as Mark Gaines
- Jeff Hayenga as Judge
- Penelope Windust as Dr. Miller
- Tom Urich as M.C.
