= Taking Back My Life: The Nancy Ziegenmeyer Story =

1992 television film by Harry Winer

- Genre: Drama
- Written by: April Smith
- Directed by: Harry Winer
- Starring: Patricia Wettig; Stephen Lang; Shelley Hack; Joanna Cassidy
- Music by: Randy Edelman
- Country of origin: United States
- Original language: English

Production
- Executive producers: Lawrence A. Lyttle; Harry Winer
- Producer: Andrew Gottlieb
- Production location: Memphis, Tennessee
- Cinematography: Thomas Alger Olgeirson
- Editors: John A. Barton; David A. Simmons
- Running time: 96 minutes
- Production company: Warner Bros. Television

Original release
- Network: CBS
- Release: March 15, 1992

Taking Back My Life: The Nancy Ziegenmeyer Story is a 1992 American made-for-television drama film about a rape victim who spoke out about her experiences and raised awareness of the fact that rape and sexual assault are never the victim's fault.

This true story inspired other victims who felt shame about what had happened to them to speak out. Rape victim Nancy Ziegenmeyer spoke openly about her experiences, including with the hospital, the police, prosecutors, the accused, and the criminal justice system.

== Book ==
Nancy Ziegenmeyer wrote the book, Taking Back My Life, to encourage women to seek help after they've been victimized.

== Pulitzer Prize ==
The Des Moines Register won the Pulitzer Prize for Public Service in 1991 for publishing the story regarding Nancy Ziegenmeyer.

== Cast ==
- Patricia Wettig as Nancy Ziegenmeyer
- Stephen Lang as Steven Ziegenmeyer
- Joanna Cassidy as Geneva Overholser
- Shelley Hack as Nan Horvat
- Elileen Brennan as Vicky Martin

== See also ==
- Post-assault treatment of sexual assault victims
- Social stigma
- Victim blaming
