= Harry Winer =

American film director

- Born: May 4, 1947 (age 78); Detroit, Michigan, U.S.
- Occupation(s): Director, producer, screenwriter
- Years active: 1975–present
- Spouse: Shelley Hack (m. 1990)
- Children: 1

Harry Winer (born May 4, 1947) is an American film and television director, producer, and screenwriter. In addition, he is an Associate Arts Professor in the Undergraduate Film and Television Department at New York University Tisch School of the Arts. Winer and his wife, Shelley Hack, are co-presidents of the production company Smash Media, which develops and produces content for motion pictures, television and new media.

== Personal life ==
Winer is married to actress Shelley Hack, with whom he has a daughter, Devon Rose (b. 1990). His father Sidney J. Winer was an entrepreneur.

== Selected filmography ==
- Hart to Hart (9 Episodes) (1981–1983)
- SpaceCamp (1986)
- Heartbeat (1 Episode) (1988)
- Taking Back My Life: The Nancy Ziegenmeyer Story (1992)
- Men Don't Tell (1993)
- House Arrest (1996)
- Jeremiah (1998)
- Lucky 7 (2003)
- Alias (2 Episodes) (2000–2001)
- Felicity (10 Episodes) (2000–2002)
- Veronica Mars (5 Episodes) (2004–2007)
- Invasion (Episode: "All God's Creatures") (2006)
