= Meredith Baxter =

American actress and producer (born 1947)

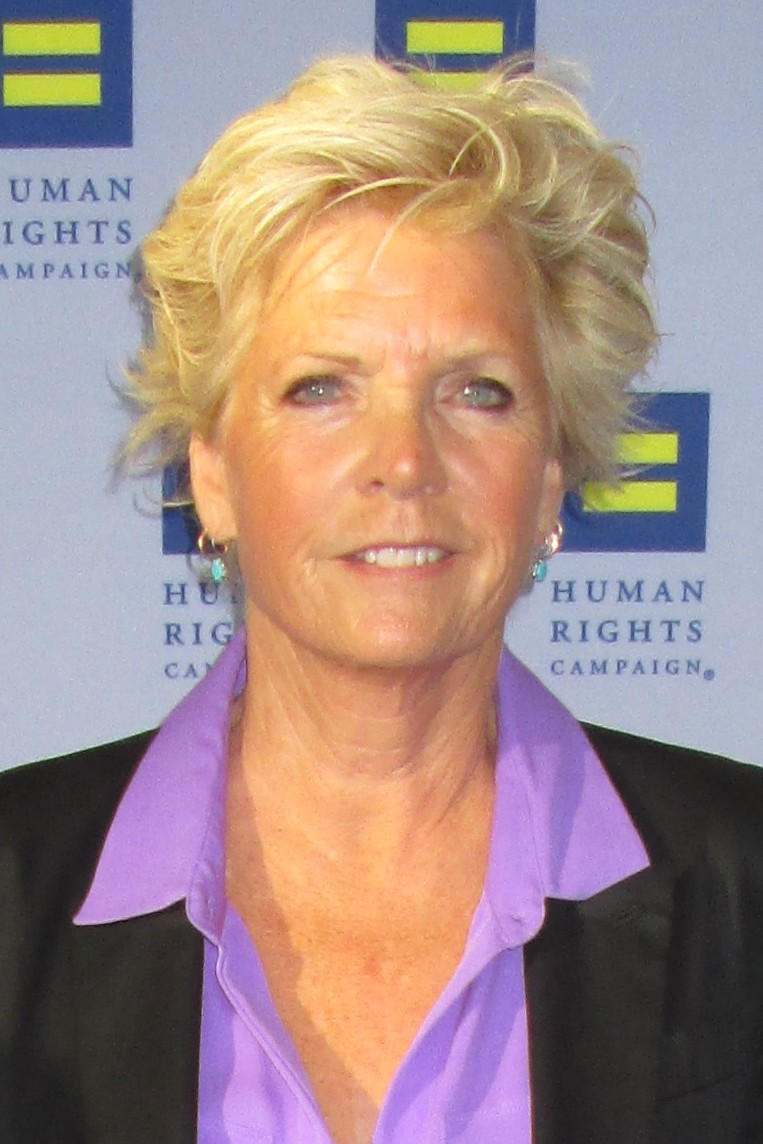
- Baxter at the Human Rights Campaign Gala in 2014
- Born: Meredith Ann Baxter; June 21, 1947 (age 79); South Pasadena, California, U.S.
- Other name: Meredith Baxter Birney
- Education: Interlochen Center for the Arts
- Occupations: Actress; producer
- Years active: 1971–present
- Spouses: Robert Lewis Bush (m. 1966; div. 1969) David Birney (m. 1974; div. 1989) Michael Blodgett (m. 1995; div. 2000) Nancy Locke (m. 2013)
- Children: 5
- Parents: Tom Baxter (father); Whitney Blake (mother)

Meredith Ann Baxter (born June 21, 1947) is an American actress and producer. She is known for her roles on the CBS sitcom Bridget Loves Bernie (1972–1973), ABC drama series Family (1976–1980) and the NBC sitcom Family Ties (1982–1989). A five-time Emmy Award nominee, one of her nominations was for playing the title role in the 1992 TV film A Woman Scorned: The Betty Broderick Story.

== Early life ==
Baxter was born on June 21, 1947, in South Pasadena, California, the daughter of actress, director and producer Whitney Blake and Tom Baxter, a radio announcer. After her parents were divorced in 1953, Baxter and her two elder brothers, Richard (born 1944) and Brian (born 1946), were raised by their mother in Pasadena. Her second stepfather was situation comedy writer Allan Manings.

Baxter was educated at James Monroe High School before transferring to Hollywood High School. During her senior year, she attended Interlochen Center for the Arts as a voice major, but returned to Hollywood High, where she graduated in 1965.

== Career ==
Baxter got her first appearance in television on The Interns, The Young Lawyers, The Doris Day Show, and Insight and in 1971 on an episode of The Partridge Family in its second season. She later appeared in 1972 as one of the stars of Bridget Loves Bernie, a CBS television network situation comedy. The series was canceled after one season. Her co-star, David Birney, became her second husband in 1974. The couple also performed on Rowan and Martin's Laugh-In in its last season in 1973. Until they were divorced in 1989, she was credited as "Meredith Baxter Birney", under which name she became widely known in 1976 on Family. She played the role of Nancy Lawrence Maitland and received two Emmy Award nominations for Outstanding Continuing Performance by a Supporting Actress in a Drama Series (1977 and 1978). In 1976, she played the wife of White House staffer Hugh W. Sloan Jr. in All the President's Men.

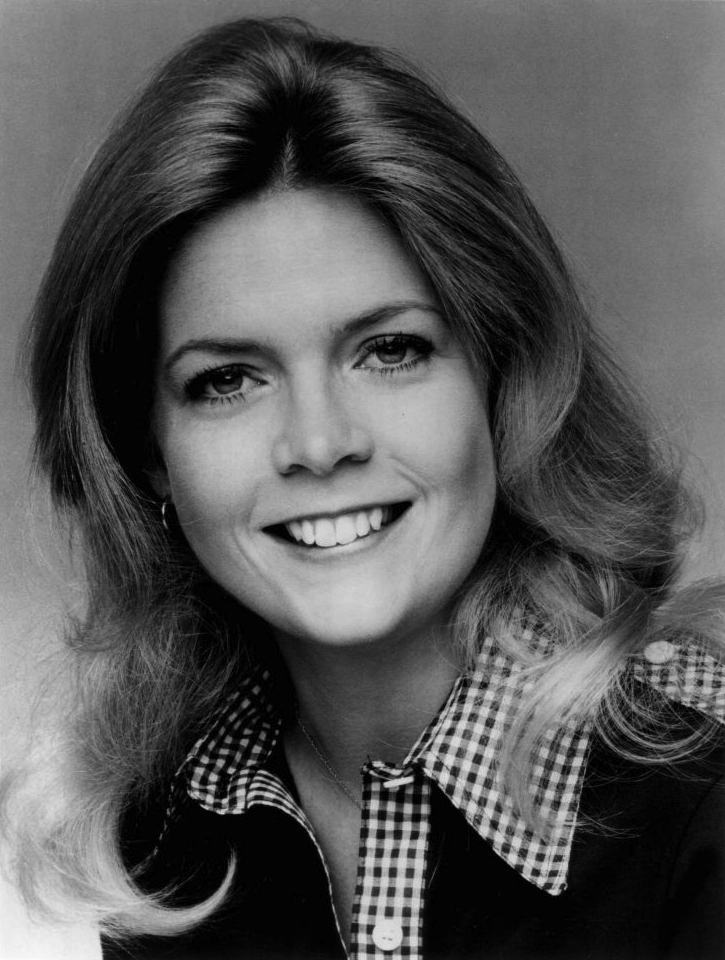
Baxter in 1977

After Family ended, she starred with Annette O'Toole and Shelley Hack in Vanities (1981), a television production of the comedy-drama stage play about the lives, loves and friendship of three Texas cheerleaders starting from high school to post-college graduation; it aired as a part of Standing Room Only, a series on the premium television channel HBO.

In 1982, Baxter landed the role of Elyse Keaton, the former flower child matriarch of the Keaton family on the NBC sitcom Family Ties. In 1986, during her time on Family Ties, Baxter earned critical acclaim for her dramatic performance as Kate Stark in the NBC television film Kate's Secret, about a seemingly "perfect" suburban housewife and mother who is secretly suffering from bulimia nervosa. Following Family Ties, Baxter produced and starred in television films. She portrayed a psychopathic kidnapper in The Kissing Place (1990) and was nominated for an Emmy Award for Outstanding Lead Actress in a Miniseries or a Special for her work in A Woman Scorned: The Betty Broderick Story (1992), based on the true story of Betty Broderick, a divorcée who was convicted of murder in the shooting of her ex-husband and his young wife. For her work on the television film My Breast (1994), she received a special award for public awareness from the National Breast Cancer Coalition. In 1997, Baxter once again played the mother of a character played by Michael J. Fox (who portrayed her son, Alex P. Keaton, on Family Ties), this time in two episodes of Spin City.

In 2005, she began appearing in television commercials for Garden State Life Insurance Company. In 2006, she temporarily co-hosted—with Matt Lauer—Today, the NBC morning news and talk show. In 2007, she made a guest appearance on What About Brian, an ABC drama series. That same year, she also made several appearances as the dying mother of Detective Lilly Rush in Cold Case, a CBS police procedural series. In recent years, Baxter created a skin care line called Meredith Baxter Simple Works, which raises funds for Baxter's breast cancer research foundation.

Baxter was the guest speaker at the 2008 Southern Commencement for National University in La Jolla, California, and was awarded an honorary doctoral degree from the university.

On March 1, 2011, Baxter's memoir, titled Untied, was published. In the book, she details her early life, her unhappy and in some cases abusive marriages, her struggles with and recovery from alcoholism, and her realization that she is a lesbian. The book became a New York Times bestseller.

She is also a spokesperson for the senior mobile service provider Consumer Cellular. She voiced the character "Elise Sr." in Dan Vs.. In April 2013, it was announced that Baxter would be in the season 4 finale episode of Glee, along with Patty Duke, as a mentor to Darren Criss's character Blaine Anderson and Chris Colfer's character, Kurt Hummel. She also made a guest appearance on the ABC Family/Freeform series Switched at Birth as the widowed mother of Kathryn Kennish (portrayed by Lea Thompson).

On August 4, 2014, producers announced that Baxter would be joining The Young and the Restless as Maureen, Nikki Newman's new drinking buddy, a "charming, intelligent, middle-class woman who has always aspired to a more privileged life than she has had". Baxter started appearing on the program on September 8. She also played the mother to "Stich" Raybourne and Kelly Andrews.

== Personal life ==
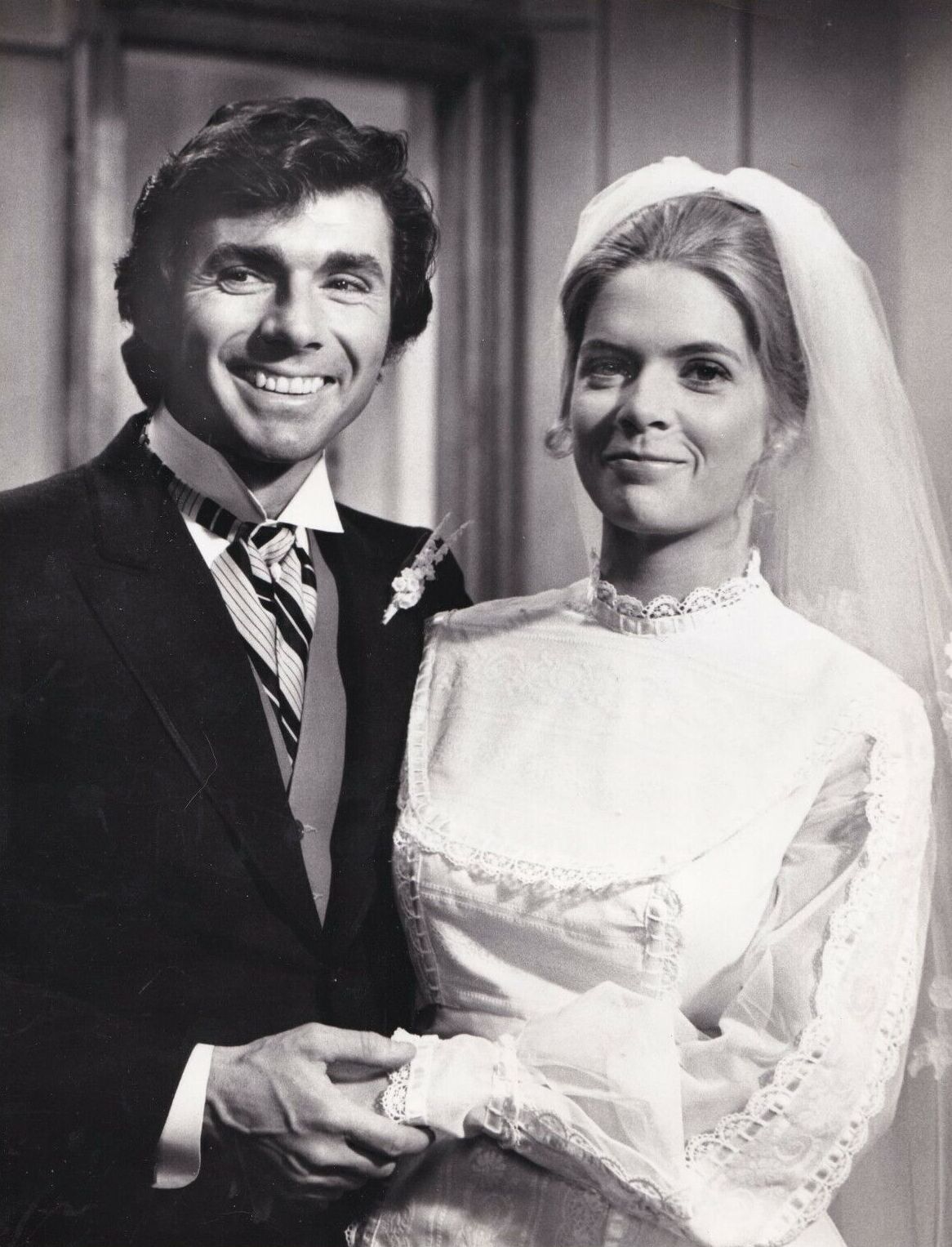
Baxter and Birney in Bridget Loves Bernie (1972)

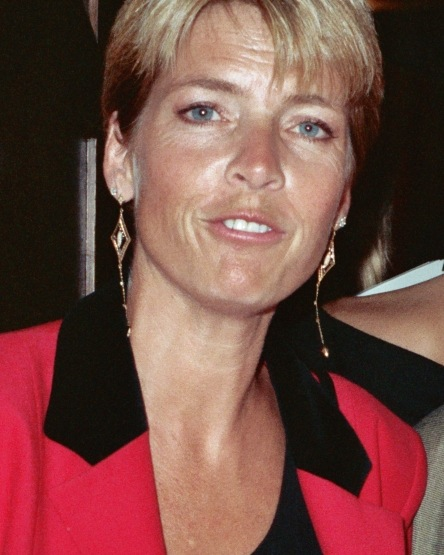
Baxter in September 1990

Baxter has been married four times and has five children.

- Robert Lewis Bush (1966–1971, divorce); two children, born 1967 and 1969
- David Birney (1974–1989, divorce); three children, one born 1974, and twins, born 1984
- Michael Blodgett (1995–2000, divorce)
- Nancy Locke (2013–present)

On December 2, 2009, Baxter came out as a lesbian during an interview with Matt Lauer on Today and on the Frank DeCaro Show on Sirius-XM OutQ 102. She said that accepting her sexual orientation helped her understand why, in part, previous relationships with men had failed.

On March 1, 2011, while promoting a memoir, Baxter alleged that her ex-husband David Birney had emotionally and physically abused her, which she had coped with by drinking alcohol. Birney denied the allegations.

The day after Baxter discussed Birney on the Today Show, she appeared on The Oprah Winfrey Show in Chicago to further discuss topics from her memoir. As a surprise arranged by Oprah's staff, Baxter's Family Ties co-star Michael Gross (who shares a birthday with Baxter) joined her on camera. Gross stated that during their seven-year collaboration on the sitcom, neither he nor anyone else connected to the series was aware of the abuse Baxter allegedly suffered at the hands of her husband, David Birney. On camera, Gross showed affection for Baxter and expressed regret that she endured the ordeal for so long. Birney vehemently denied the claims that he had abused Baxter.

Baxter is a vegetarian.

Baxter was diagnosed with breast cancer in 1999. After treatment, she made a full recovery.

== Filmography ==
=== Film ===
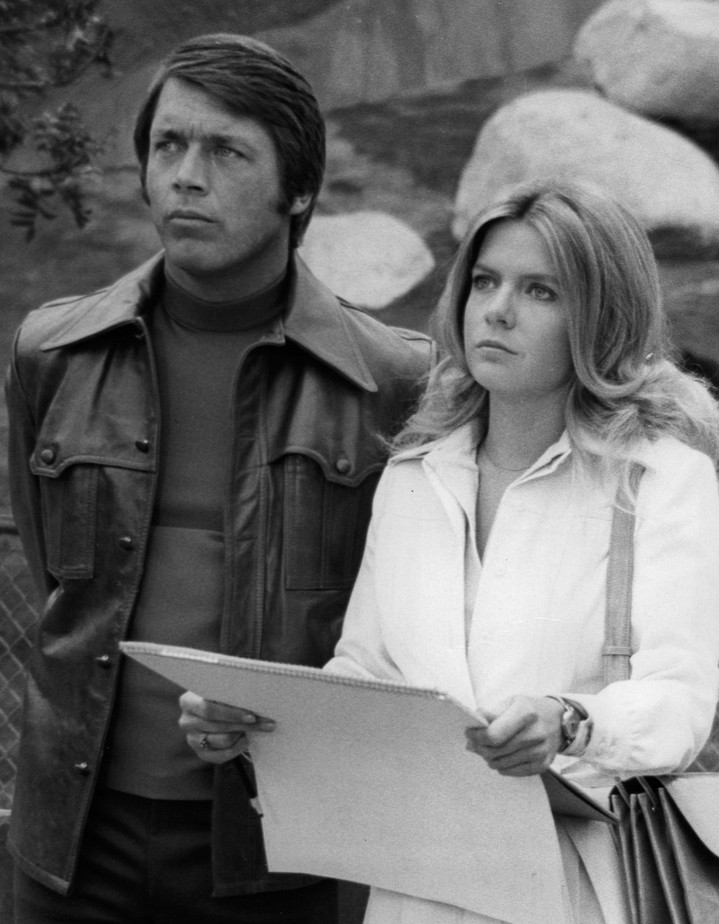
Chad Everett and Baxter in 1975

Year	Title	Role
1972	Stand Up and Be Counted	Tracy
1972	Ben	Eve Garrison
1976	All the President's Men	Debbie Sloan
1976	Bittersweet Love	Patricia
1990	Jezebel's Kiss	Virginia De Leo
1999	Elevator Seeking	Ann
1999	Down will come baby	Leah Garr
2003	Devil's Pond	Kate
2005	Paradise Texas	Liz Cameron
2005	The Mostly Unfabulous Social Life of Ethan Green	Harper Green
2008	The Onion Movie	Cooking Show Chef
2010	Airline Disaster	President Harriet Franklin
2013	Reading Writing and Romance	Mrs. Wenders
2014	Letter to Anita: The Ronni Sanlo Story	Herself
2019	Undateable John	Beatrice

=== Television ===
Year	Title	Role	Notes
1971	The Interns	Millie	Episode: "The Secret"
1971	The Partridge Family	Jenny	Episode: "Where Do Mermaids Go?"
1971	The Young Lawyers	Gloria	Episode: "The Victims"
1971	The Doris Day Show	April	Episode: "Young Love"
1972	Owen Marshall, Counselor at Law	Ann Glover	Episode: "Words of Summer"
1972–1973	Bridget Loves Bernie	Bridget Fitzgerald Steinberg	Main role
1973	Rowan & Martin's Laugh-In	Herself	Episode: "Meredith Baxter and David Birney"
1973	The Invasion of Carol Enders	Carol Enders	Television film
1973	Doc Elliot	Jenny	Episode: "And All Ye Need to Know"
1973	The Cat Creature	Rena Carter	Television film
1974	Barnaby Jones	Jenny Sutherland	Episode: "The Deadly Jinx"
1974	The Stranger Who Looks Like Me	Joanne Denver	Television film
1974	Young Love	April	Pilot aired later
1974–1975	Medical Center	Paula; Priscilla	2 episodes
1975	Target Risk	Linda Flayly	Television film
1975	The Night That Panicked America	Linda Davis	Television film
1975	The Imposter	Julie Watson	Television film
1975	The Streets of San Francisco	Jodi Dixon	Episode: "Deadly Silence"
1975	Medical Story	Erica Schiff; Sunny	2 episodes
1975	McMillan & Wife	Faye Leonard	Episode: "Secrets for Sale"
1976	City of Angels	Mary Kingston	3 episodes
1976	Wide World of Mystery		Episode: "Terror in the Night"
1976	Police Woman	Liz Robson	Episode: "Sara Who?"
1976–1980	Family	Nancy Lawrence Maitland	Main role
1977-1982	The Love Boat	Sandy Rytell/Francesca Randall	2 episodes
1978	Little Women	Meg March	Miniseries
1979	The Family Man	Mercedes Cole	Television film
1980	Beulah Land	Lauretta Pennington	Miniseries
1981	Vanities	Joanne	Television film
1981	The Two Lives of Carol Letner	Carol Letner	Television film
1982	Take Your Best Shot	Carol Marriner	Television film
1982	The Love Boat	Francesca "Fran" Randall	2 episodes
1982–1989	Family Ties	Elyse Keaton	Main role
1985	Family Ties Vacation	Elyse Keaton	Television film
1985	The Rape of Richard Beck	Barbara McKee	Television film
1986	Kate's Secret	Kate Stark	Television film
1987	The Long Journey Home	Maura Wells	Television film
1988	Mickey's 60th Birthday	Elyse Keaton	Television film
1988	Winnie	Winnie	Television film
1989	American Playhouse	Eve	Episode: "The Diaries of Adam and Eve"
1989	She Knows Too Much	Samantha White	Television film
1990	The Kissing Place	Florence Tulane	Television film
1990	Burning Bridges	Lynn Hollinger	Television film
1991	Bump in the Night	Martha Tierney	Television film
1992	A Woman Scorned: The Betty Broderick Story	Betty Broderick	Television film
1992	Her Final Fury: Betty Broderick - The Last Chapter	Betty Broderick	Sequel to A Woman Scorned
1992	Stolen Love	DeeDee	
1993	Darkness Before Dawn	Mary Ann Guard	Television film also co-executive producer
1993	CBS Schoolbreak Special	Paula Hensen	Episode: "Other Mothers"; won a Daytime Emmy Award for her role
1994	For the Love of Aaron	Margaret Gibson	Television film
1994	One More Mountain	Margaret Reed	Television film
1994	My Breast	Joyce Wadler	Television film - also co-executive producer
1995	Betrayed: A Story of Three Women	Amanda Nelson	Television film - also co-executive producer
1996	The Faculty	Flynn Sullivan	13 episodes also executive producer
1996	After Jimmy	Maggie Stapp	Television film
1997	Dog's Best Friend	Cow (voice)	Television film
1997	The Inheritance	Beatrice Hamilton	Television film
1997	Let Me Call You Sweetheart	D.A. Kerry McGrath	Television film
1997	Miracle in the Woods	Sarah Weatherby	Television film
1997	Spin City	Macy Flaherty	Episode: "Family Affair"
1999	Holy Joe	Annie Cass	Television film
1999	Down Will Come Baby	Leah Garr	Television film
1999	Miracle on the 17th Green	Susan McKinley	Television film
2000	The Wednesday Woman	Muriel Davidson	Television film
2001	A Mother's Fight for Justice	Terry Stone	Television film
2001	Aftermath	Carol	Television film
2001	Murder on the Orient Express	Mrs. Caroline Hubbard	Television film
2002	A Christmas Visitor	Carol Boyajian	Television film
2003	7th Heaven	Mrs. Jones	Episode: "Go Ask Alice"
2003	Lingo	Herself	
2004	Half & Half	Joan Tyrell	1 episode
2004	Angel in the Family	Lorraine	Television film
2005	The Closer	Congresswoman Simmons	Episode: "Fantasy Date"
2006	Brothers & Sisters	Margaret Packard	Episode: "For the Children"
2006–2007	Cold Case	Ellen Rush	5 episodes
2007	What About Brian	Frankie	Episode: "What About All That Glitters..."
2009–2011	Family Guy	Elyse Keaton / Herself / Carol	3 episodes
2009	Bound by a Secret	Ida Mae	Television film
2009	Brothers	TV Mom	Episode: "Episode: Commercial – Coach DMV"
2010	We Have to Stop Now	Judy	Web series Episode: "The Grass Is Always Greener"
2010	RuPaul's Drag U	Herself	1 episode: Appeared as a guest judge
2011	The Oprah Winfrey Show	Herself	1 episode
2011–2013	Dan Vs.	Elise Sr.	4 episodes
2012–2015	Switched at Birth	Bonnie Tamblyn Dixon	2 episodes
2012	Naughty or Nice	Carol Kringle	Television film
2013	Glee	Liz	Episode: "All or Nothing"
2013	The Neighbors	Mother Joyner	2 episodes
2013	Shadow on the Mesa	Emilie Rawlins	Television film
2014	The Young and the Restless	Maureen Russell	Recurring role
2014–2015	Finding Carter	Gammy	Recurring role
2015	Becoming Santa	Jessica Claus	Television film
2015	Being Mary Jane	Simone	Episode: "Some Things Are Black and White"
2016	Skirtchasers	Lilah Samuels	Television film
2016	Hell's Kitchen	Herself	Episode: "7 Chefs Compete"
2016	Code Black	Joanna	Episode: "Landslide"

== Award nominations ==
Year	Award	Work	Result
1977	Primetime Emmy Award for Outstanding Supporting Actress in a Drama Series	Family	Nominated
1978	Primetime Emmy Award for Outstanding Supporting Actress in a Drama Series	Family	Nominated
1992	Primetime Emmy Award for Outstanding Lead Actress in a Miniseries or a Special	A Woman Scorned: The Betty Broderick Story	Nominated
1994	Daytime Emmy Award for Outstanding Performer in a Children's Special	CBS Schoolbreak Special	Nominated
2007	TV Land Award	Lady You Love To Watch Fight For Her Life in a Movie of the Week	Nominated
2015	Daytime Emmy Award for Outstanding Special Guest Performer in a Drama Series	The Young and the Restless	Nominated

== Books ==
- Baxter, Meredith (2011). Untied: A Memoir of Family, Fame, and Floundering. New York: Crown Archetype. ISBN 978-0-307-71930-0. OCLC 768710740.
