= Standing Room Only (TV series) =

- Logo
- Also known as: SRO
- Genre: entertainment
- Starring: Various
- Country of origin: United States

Production
- Running time: Varies

Original release
- Network: HBO
- Release: June 19, 1976

Standing Room Only (SRO) is an entertainment series on HBO that premiered on June 19, 1976. Shows featured concerts, burlesque shows, ventriloquism programs, magic shows, and more. From 1982 to 1986, a version of the "HBO in Space" program opening sequence was used to introduce the series.

== Partial list of programs ==
- Cher
- Bette Midler
- Victor Borge
- Totie Fields
- Paul Anka
- Neil Sedaka
- Casino De Paris
- Barry Manilow
- Diana Ross
- Liza Minnelli
- Kenny Rogers
- Linda Ronstadt
- George Burns
- Crystal Gayle
- Billy Joel
- Willie Nelson
- Olivia Newton-John
- Simon and Garfunkel
- David Bowie
- Dolly Parton
- Red Skelton: A Royal Performance
- Christmas in New York
- Johnny Cash
- Abracadabra, It's Magic
- Daredevils
- Barefoot In The Park
- Vanities
- Country Rock '82
- Freddie the Freeloader's Christmas Dinner
- Red Skelton's More Funny Faces starring Marcel Marceau
- An Evening at the Moulin Rouge
- The Last Great Vaudeville Show
- Milton Berle's Magic of the Stars
- Sherlock Holmes
- Fleetwood Mac
- Blondie

== See also ==
- List of programs broadcast by HBO
