= A Hole Is to Dig =

1952 children's picture book

- Author: Ruth Krauss
- Illustrator: Maurice Sendak
- Genre: Juvenile fiction
- Publisher: HarperCollins
- Publication date: June 1, 1952
- ISBN: 0-06-023405-9

A Hole Is to Dig is a 1952 children's book written by American author Ruth Krauss and illustrated by Maurice Sendak, released on June 1, 1952. It is subtitled, "A first book of first definitions". Sixty years after its publication, Horn Book Magazine called it "the most influential book written entirely in the language of children".

== Background ==
Author Ruth Krauss gathered ideas for A Hole Is to Dig starting in 1950, when she visited a kindergarten class in Rowayton, Connecticut, and recorded the phrases they used.

The book is considered illustrator Maurice Sendak's first major picture book. Sendak later wrote that as A Hole Is to Dig was nearing completion, Krauss became upset about "middle-class" gender biases in his illustrations, such as "boys doing boy things, and girls (even worse!) doing girl things". According to Sendak, she screamed, "God forbid, a boy should jump rope!", leading him to hastily make changes to the drawings.

== Contents ==
A Hole Is to Dig has definitions of words as explained by young children, starting with "Mashed potatoes are to give everybody enough". Other examples include, "Mud is to jump in", "A whistle is to make people jump", and "Rugs are so dogs have napkins." The original 1952 edition has 46 pages of words and illustrations.

== Reception ==
The book received enthusiastic reviews when it was first published and is now considered a classic. In 1954, The New York Times called it a "memorable and widely quoted collection of definitions". In an article for Horn Book Magazine in 2012, literary scholar Philip Nel wrote, "Its freshness and humor, and the misperception that the book was 'sweet' or 'sentimental,' also played some role in its success, as did its covertly radical celebration of the child's right to dream and to question the authority of adults." A School Library Journal review of the 1990 audio recording said, "Youngsters will look at and laugh at the hilarious, detailed ink drawings by Maurice Sendak over and over again."

Krauss and Sendak published another book inspired by children, Love Is a Word, in 1954. The 2026 children's book A Door Is to Open and the title of They Might Be Giants' 2026 album The World Is to Dig are homages to A Hole Is to Dig.
