= David Piel =

American television producer and actor

- Born: David Joseph Piel; 1923; New York City, New York, USA
- Died: May 6, 2004 (aged 80); Carson City, Nevada, USA
- Other name: David J. Piel
- Education: The Taft School; Yale University
- Occupations: Television producer, director, animator, actor
- Spouse(s): Leslie Semple Fellner m. 1946; div. 1949; Hedwig "Hedi" Seligsohn m. 1949; Doloris "Dee" Rudolph m. 1980
- Relatives: Gerard Piel (brother)

David Joseph Piel (1923 – May 6, 2004) was an American television director, producer and actor, best known for his contributions to children's television programming, in particular, the nearly 50 limited animation "Story Films" he produced and directed for Captain Kangaroo. He also directed the first screen adaptation of Crockett Johnson's hugely successful picture book, Harold and the Purple Crayon, and created the initially successful but short-lived, semi-animated TV series, Big Mac and His Magic Train.

Piel was a grandson of Piels Beer founder Michael Piel, and the younger brother of science writer and publisher Gerard Piel.

== Early life and career ==
A native of New York City, born in 1923, Piel was raised there and in Salisbury, Connecticut, the youngest son of opera singer Loretto Scott and Piels beer president William F.J. Piel. He attended The Taft School and Yale, graduating in 1947.

Completion of Piel's collegiate studies was delayed by the nation's entry into World War II, in which he served with the United States Marines, although not as a combatant. Spared that fate by substandard eyesight, Piel nonetheless saw plenty of action and helped fellow Americans do the same, serving as war correspondent and sometime-sketch artist, most notably at Okinawa (the battle codenamed Operation Iceberg), one of the Pacific campaign's most costly ventures. One of his series of sketches—tracing a wounded compatriot's journey, from battlefield trauma to hospital bed—was later used to elicit blood donations from those on the home front.

In August 1948, Boxoffice reported that Piel and two fellow New Yorkers had launched the multi-media production company, Ray Films. However, by the fall of 1949, he was residing in Reno, Nevada, where, while taking that city's proverbial "cure" for his maternally arranged first marriage, Piel had found employment—initially as an announcer, and later a reporter—at radio station KOLO.

In August 1953, the San Antonio Light's pseudonymous gossip columnist—one of the field's many Cholly Knickerbockers—informed readers that the still relatively little known Piel—here identified as "the Piel heir"—had "some TV deals brewing".

News of this particular Piel heir next emerged on Christmas Day, 1955, courtesy of Bridgeport Post reporter Betty Tayler. "Harold has been so well received that Johnson already is working on a sequel, and on an animated cartoon, to be produced by David Piel and released by Movie House." By April of the following year, the New York Herald Tribune had noted both the formation of David Piel Inc. and the fact that its founder was the "creator, producer, and director" of the "charming new 'Story Films' seen on CBS-TV's children's shows [and currently] enjoying second and third runs on the network's 'Captain Kangaroo' show".

In October 1957, Piel's finished version of Harold and the Purple Crayon was screened—and, reportedly, "loved"—by both Johnson himself and his wife and frequent collaborator Ruth Krauss, as well as several representatives of Harper Books, who hoped to publish a paperback edition of the book, concurrent with the film's release. The film was ultimately released by Brandon Films in 1959.

Piel's notable acting credits include the Broadway production of Joseph Heller's We Bombed in New Haven, and as the briefly seen, quickly befuddled, and promptly pied-to-death security guard—in 1988's Killer Klowns From Outer Space. (Note: Although—given the character's custard-entombed denouement—the directors had reportedly hoped to cast erstwhile TV host/frequent pie recipient Soupy Sales in the role (a hope promptly squelched by cost-cutting producers, fearful that too few would remember Sales, much less get the inside joke), the substitution of Piels constituted both a more affordable and immeasurably more 'inside' joke, not to mention a much more apt analogy, especially so in November 2025, when what appears to be the sole remaining excerpt of Piel's pride and joy, Big Mac and His Magic Train, features a denouement—that of the similarly overmatched Keystone Kops, hoping to quell a massive pie-throwing riot (perpetrated, ironically, by society's 'upper crust')—which perfectly presages that of Killer's hapless security guard.)

== Personal life and death ==
Piel's 1946 marriage to Leslie Semple Fellner—arranged, as had been the initial marriage of each of his older siblings, by their mother—ended in divorce three years later. Within days, he was married to German-born writer, Hedwig "Hedi" Seligsohn, who would later become Vice President of David Piel, Inc., and also co-writer—along with Chet Gierlach and Leonard Whitcup—of the titular theme song of Big Mac and His Magic Train. The marriage produced two children, a daughter, Candida, and a son, Geoffrey.

On May 2, 1980, in Burlington, Vermont, Piel married Doloris Rudolph, née Adams. They later moved to San Francisco's Marina District, and, in 1991, to Carson City, Nevada, where, in 1993, his Pogonip & Mule Ears : A Souvenir Book, was published.

On May 6, 2004, Piel died following a brief illness at his home in Carson City, at age 80. He was survived by his wife, Dee, children Candida and Geoffrey, stepchildren John and Paula Randolph, and two grandchildren.
