= Elves, Leprechauns, Gnomes, and Little Men's Chowder & Marching Society =

Fictional organization from Barnaby

The Elves, Leprechauns, Gnomes, and Little Men's Chowder & Marching Society was the fraternal organization frequented by Mr. O’Malley, the fairy godfather in Crockett Johnson’s daily comic strip Barnaby. The actual locale of the ELG&LMC&MS, as it was often referred to in the comic strip, was never seen in the strip itself, but it was known to be the favorite gathering spot for all the so-called imaginary creatures featured in the strip. Other ELG&LMC&MS members, such as McSnoyd the invisible leprechaun and Atlas the diminutive mental giant, often turned up to regale Barnaby with tales of the short-comings of Mr. O’Malley, who was regarded by his fellow little men as something of a windbag. It was from the ELG&LMC&MS that O’Malley launched his successful campaign for the US Congress.

A variant of the name was adopted by a science fiction fan organization: The Elves, Gnomes, and Little Men's Science Fiction, Chowder & Marching Society.

It was also the name of "an ad hoc group [of Marines] that fluctuated in number from three or four to as many as ten." Members included Victor H. Krulak and Lyford Hutchins, among various others. Its purpose was to oppose the destruction of the Marine Corps at the hands of the other armed services in the first years following World War II.
