= Harold and the Purple Crayon =

1955 children's book by Crockett Johnson

- First edition, designed by Crockett Johnson
- Author: Crockett Johnson
- Genre: Children's novel
- Publisher: Harper & Brothers
- Publication date: 1955
- Publication place: United States
- Pages: 64
- OCLC: 22963112
- Dewey Decimal: [E] 22
- LC Class: MLCS 2006/43120 (P)

Harold and the Purple Crayon is a 1955 children's picture book written and illustrated by Crockett Johnson. Published by HarperCollins Publishers, it is Johnson's most popular book, with more than 5 and a half million copies sold and being translated into more than 14 languages, it has led to a series of other related books, as well as many adaptations. The story is written in third-person point-of-view, and follows a toddler boy on an imaginative adventure through the night.

The book was an immediate success, and has remained a staple of children's literature, earning recognition on major lists. It is frequently used in education of young children. Furthermore, scholars have examined and analyzed the book's content and underlying themes. Numerous adaptations have been created, including animated short films, a television series, a live-action film, and a planned Broadway musical.

== Background ==
David Johnson Leisk, known by his professional name Crockett Johnson, was born in New York City in 1906. From an early age Johnson was relentlessly creative. Johnson was known for his first comic strip Barnaby in 1942 which showed his knack for simplistic art and later defined his work. He continued to practice cartooning children's books, while collaborating with his wife Ruth Krauss. Together the two produced their next book The Carrot Seed. Later, Johnson created Harold and the Purple Crayon. According to Nel, Johnson designed the book to be around six inches tall and five inches wide, made to be fit for a young child's hand. The name Harold is thought to be in honor of his nephew. 10,000 copies were sold in the first printing. This later pushed Johnson to continue the series to write Harold's Fairytale.

== Plot ==
The protagonist, Harold, is a curious four-year-old boy who, with his magic purple crayon, has the power to create a world of his own simply by drawing it.

Harold wants to go for a walk in the moonlight, but there is no moon, so he draws one. He has nowhere to walk, so he draws a path. Using his purple crayon, he goes on many adventures including encountering a dragon guarding an apple tree, boating through deep waters, eating a picnic consisting only of nine flavors of pies, and flying in a hot-air balloon that saves him from a fall. Eventually Harold grows tired, and searches for his bedroom window in order to go to bed. He draws many windows, drawing an entire city, yet none are his. Finally, Harold remembers where his window is situated and constructs his own room and bed, and nods off to sleep.

== Book series ==
- Harold and the Purple Crayon (1955)
- Harold's Fairy Tale (1956)
- Harold's Trip to the Sky (1957)
- Harold at the North Pole (1958)
- Harold's Circus (1959)
- A Picture for Harold's Room (easy reader, 1960)
- Harold's ABC (1963)
- Harold and His Friends: A Harold and the Purple Crayon Treasury (2003)
- Adventures of Harold and His Friends (2005)
- Harold's Treasure Hunt (posthumous, 2020)

== Reception ==
Harold and the Purple Crayon has consistently been well regarded as a children's literature favorite and has been praised for its combination of themes of childhood imagination and reality. There have been nine sequels. Remaining popular amongst children's teachers, it ranked in the National Education Association's "Teachers' Top 100 Books for Children," and ranked 16th among School Library Journal's "Top 100 Picture Books" in its 2012 survey.

In 2010, feminist scholar Louise Collins offered a critique of the book, arguing that its depiction of childhood creativity relies on masculinist ideals. She pointed out that Harold is shown drawing, but never speaking for himself, and that an adult narrator stays in control of the story the entire time. In contrast, Philip Nel argues that Harold and the Purple Crayon carries political meaning, suggesting that Harold's ability to adapt and use his imagination shows younger children that they can push back against a world they don't have full control over.

== Uses in education ==
Harold and the Purple Crayon has been credied with shaping a whole genre of picture books about young artists who "sometimes struggle with but ultimately take delight in the artistic process like Harold."Book Links celebrated the book's 60th anniversary with a dedicated feature that shows how central Harold has become to children's literature about creativity. Scholar of early childhood education Burhanettin Keskin has emphasized that the book has real value in the classroom, in that it provides a path through difficult topics like feeling lost and separated from home, and teaches young children to be brave and curious.

The book has been used frequently in children's and art education lesson plans, as well as referenced in other children's literature.

== Analysis ==
Harold as depicted on the original 1955 cover, with "tan" skin, and on the 1998 reprint, with "light peach" skin.

In 2024, scholar of children's literature and Johnson biographer Philip Nel wrote that Johnson may have originally intended Harold to be a Black child. He based this on an analysis of the original art with Johnson's notes to the printer as to what percentage of what color inks should be used to represent Harold's skin, and compared this to how Caucasian skin tone was typically represented by the printing technology of that era, concluding that Harold was deliberately portrayed as brown. Nel placed this in the context of Johnson's history of anti-racism, noting that this had brought him to the attention of the FBI, which perceived advocacy for racial equality as communist; he further observed that Johnson's wife Ruth Krauss had written an explicitly anti-racist children's book some years earlier which had been rejected by publishers. As such, Nel posited that Harold's skin tone may have been a "subtle political statement" intended to provide "cover" to Johnson and his publisher. Ultimately, Nel concluded that — prior to the 1998 reprint, where the publishers modified the cover art, changing Harold's skin tone from "original tan to light peach" — Harold was "racially ambiguous", and emphasized that although he himself had (as a child) perceived Harold as white, others (including Chris Ware and Bryan Collier) had not.

=== Literary analysis ===
In Burhanettin's interpretation he highlights that Crockett introduces ideas such that imagination and reality overlap and in his words this is called "translucent reality.”Harold creates images or creatures that produce consequences for him, which force him to respond like they are real. Imagined results can influence outcomes in real ways, this is how Harold showed that imagination and reality overlap.

The book has 3 main recurring visual symbols which are Harold, the purple Crayon and the moon. In a study of the book, Philip Nel describes that Harold is interpreted to be the artist, the crayon is the artistic middle ground and the moon is a presence and guides him throughout his adventures. According to How to Draw the World: Harold and the Purple Crayon and the Making of Children's Classic, Nel delves into how the color purple is historically known to be one of the first colors ever available to American schoolchildren. That is what makes the book so special to children's literature as a common theme is using an object to empower young children.

An interesting point to note about Harold and the Purple Crayon is the ambiguous endings. Unlike most other children's literature novels that end in happily ever afters, Harold never ends up in a fantastical world. The only world he ends up in, is the one he draws. According to Nel, some readers have found this particular ending unsettling, while others view this in a positive light. Harold can create a sense of home and safety anywhere through using his imagination. This unclear ending has been one of the main reasons the book has resonated with readers of all different ages.

== Legacy ==
One of the protagonists in Captain Underpants, Harold Hutchins, is named after the protagonist in the book, with its author, Dav Pilkey, insisting on naming his main characters after his "childhood literary loves." In the book This Thing Called Life: Prince's Odyssey, On and Off the Record by the author Neal Karlen, Prince's mother, Mattie Shaw, confirmed that his favorite book as a child was Harold and the Purple Crayon and was the reason for Prince's love of the color purple.

The book inspired programmer Petri Purho to create the computer game Crayon Physics Deluxe.

== Adaptations ==
=== Educational shorts ===
The original story was adapted by Weston Woods Studios and Brandon Films into a seven-minute Animation short film in 1959, directed by David Piel and narrated by Norman Rose., Gene Deitch directed additional two shorts A Picture for Harold's Room in 1971, and Harold's Fairy Tale in 1974. These shorts were also featured on the popular CBS children's television show Captain Kangaroo, which ran for 29 years on the network. In 1993, these three educational shorts were packaged with a documentary, and sold as the Harold and the Purple Crayon and Other Harold Stories VHS set.

=== Television series ===
Harold and the Purple Crayon
- Genre: Fantasy
- Developed by: Carin Greenberg Baker; Jeff Kline
- Voices of: Connor Matheus
- Narrated by: Sharon Stone
- Composers: Van Dyke Parks; Kevin Kiner
- Country of origin: United States
- Original language: English
- No. of seasons: 1
- No. of episodes: 13

Production
- Executive producers: Jeff Kline; Dolores Morris
- Producer: Bob Hathcock
- Editor: CK Horness
- Running time: 23 minutes
- Production companies: Adelaide Productions; Columbia TriStar Television

Original release
- Network: HBO Family
- Release: December 1, 2001 – March 23, 2002

In 2001, the stories were adapted by Adelaide Productions into a 13-episode animated television series for HBO narrated by Sharon Stone and featuring Connor Matheus as the voice of Harold. The series won a Daytime Emmy Award for "Main Title Design", and was nominated for an Annie Award and Humanitas Prize. The series aired on HBO Family from December 1, 2001, to March 23, 2002. The show was also released on VHS and DVD.

The series focuses on Harold using his purple crayon to explore a new world. Each episode has Harold focusing on life lessons throughout his journeys.

==== Episodes ====
No.	Title	Directed by	Written by	Original release date
1	"Harold and the Purple Crayon"	Tom Ellery	Carin Greenberg Baker	December 1, 2001
Harold can't sleep and uses his purple crayon to create a fantastic world.
2	"Blame It on the Rain"	Tom Ellery	Eric Weiner	January 5, 2002
Harold wants to know where rain comes from.
3	"Fly Away Home"	Sean Song	Don Gillies	January 12, 2002
Harold learns that no matter how small he is, he can accomplish big things.
4	"A Dog's Tale"	Andy Thom	Carin Greenberg Baker	January 19, 2002
Harold's stuffed toy comes to life.
5	"One Crayon Band"	Sean Song	Jan Strnad	January 26, 2002
Harold learns about music.
6	"I Remember Goldie"	Tom Ellery	Carin Greenberg Baker	February 2, 2002
Harold's goldfish dies, so a mermaid helps him understand the meaning of death.
7	"Harold's Birthday Gift"	Andy Thom	Melody Fox	February 9, 2002
Harold celebrates his birthday and learns that the true birthday gift is friendship.
8	"A Blast from the Past"	Tom Ellery	Don Gillies	February 16, 2002
Harold uses his imagination to travel back to prehistoric times.
9	"Harold the Artiste"	Chuck Drost	Stu Krieger	February 23, 2002
Harold can't draw a perfect circle, so he uses his purple crayon to visit a museum and later learns to appreciate his drawings, no matter the perfection.
10	"Harold's Walk on the Wild Side"	Tom Ellery	Don Gillies	March 2, 2002
Harold imagines what would it be like to be an animal.
11	"Harold in the Dark"	Andy Thom	Stu Krieger	March 9, 2002
Harold wonders where the moon has gone.
12	"Future Clock"	Sean Song	Thomas Hart	March 16, 2002
Harold wonders what would it be like to be grown up.
13	"Cowboy Harold"	Chap Yaep	Stu Krieger	March 23, 2002
Harold refuses to eat squash and imagines being a cowboy.

=== Feature film ===
In February 2010, it was reported that Columbia Pictures and Sony Pictures Animation was developing an animated film adaptation of Harold and the Purple Crayon, to be produced by Will Smith and James Lassiter through their production company Overbrook Entertainment, and written by Josh Klausner, but it never came to fruition. In December 2016, it was reported that the film would also be written by Dallas Clayton.

On February 1, 2021, it was reported that Zachary Levi would star in the film, later revealed to be portraying Harold as a grown man and film will be a Live Action Animated film. It was also announced that David Guion and Michael Handelman replaced Klausner and Clayton as screenwriters, with John Davis producing. While Zooey Deschanel was added in the cast, it was announced that Carlos Saldanha was attached to direct the film. The film was originally scheduled to be released on January 27, 2023, but was pushed back to June 30, 2023, and later August 2, 2024.

=== Stage ===
There have also been two theater adaptations; one in 2008, another from 2009-2011.

==== Broadway musical ====
On March 11, 2022, a Broadway musical adaptation was announced. It will feature an original score by Jack and Ryan Met from the band AJR and will focus on an adult version of Harold facing challenges in everyday life without his magical purple crayon. As of 2024, there have been no updates on the musical.
