= Barnaby (comics) =

Comic strip

- Barnaby cast (l. to r.): Gus the Ghost, Jackeen J. O'Malley, Gorgon Baxter, Barnaby Baxter and Jane Shultz
- Author(s): Crockett Johnson (1942–1946, 1947–1952); Jack Morley and Ted Ferro (1946–1947); Warren Sattler (1960–1962)
- Current status/schedule: Ended
- Launch date: April 20, 1942 (PM) revived September 12, 1960
- End date: February 2, 1952 revival ended April 14, 1962
- Syndicate(s): Field Enterprises Syndicate

Barnaby is a comic strip which began April 20, 1942, in the newspaper PM and was later syndicated in 64 American newspapers (for a combined circulation of more than 5,500,000).

Created by Crockett Johnson, who is best known today for his children's book Harold and the Purple Crayon, the strip featured a cherubic-looking five-year-old and his far-from-cherubic fairy godfather, Jackeen J. O'Malley, a short, cigar-smoking man with four tiny wings. With a distinctive appearance because of its use of typography, the strip had numerous reprints and was adapted into a 1940s stage production. The usually caustic Dorothy Parker had nothing but praise: "I think, and I'm trying to talk calmly, that Barnaby and his friends and oppressors are the most important additions to American Arts and Letters in Lord knows how many years."

== Characters and story ==
One night after having been read a fairy tale involving a fairy godmother by his mother, Barnaby Baxter received a visit through his bedroom window from the cigar-wielding and pink wings-wearing Jackeen J. (J. J.) O'Malley, who announced that he was Barnaby's fairy godfather. This began a series of adventures with Mr. O'Malley that frequently got the pair of them into scrapes, most of which were either of Mr. O'Malley's making or resulted in embarrassment of some sort for the rather clumsy fairy godfather, a member of the Elves, Leprechauns, Gnomes, and Little Men's Chowder & Marching Society. Many of their adventures have surprising results, such as uncovering a gang of criminals hiding their loot in a supposedly haunted house, Barnaby's winning a scrap iron contest while out searching for a leprechaun's pot of gold, and unmasking a spy working in Mr. Baxter's office.

Barnaby's parents deny that Mr. O'Malley is real and take Barnaby to child psychologists. This denial continues even when O'Malley is seen flying past their picture window, when he walks into their living room, and even after he is elected their representative to Congress.

As time passes, more characters are added, including Jane Schultz, the little girl from down the street who did not believe in Mr. O'Malley until she saw him; Gorgon, Barnaby's talking dog (who never talks in front of the adults); Gus, the timid, glasses-wearing ghost; Atlas the Mental Giant (who is physically Barnaby's size); and Launcelot McSnoyd, the annoying invisible leprechaun who speaks with a Brooklyn accent.

The strip ended when Barnaby reached his sixth birthday, the magical point beyond which he could no longer have a fairy godfather. With much regret, O'Malley leaves.

== History ==
Barnaby was primarily a daily strip which began April 20, 1942, and later had a short-lived Sunday strip (December 1, 1946, to May 30, 1948). Instead of hand-lettering, Barnaby used typography in the balloons. The typeface is Italic Futura Medium, which was designed by the German typographer Paul Renner in the 1920s.

In 1946, when Johnson began to concentrate on his children's books, the strip was drawn by Johnson's Connecticut neighbor, artist Jack Morley, who had previously drawn editorial cartoons for the New York Journal American. For a year, Morley collaborated on the writing of the strip with Ted Ferro, who teamed with his wife for nine years on their scripts for the daytime comedy-drama radio serial, Lorenzo Jones. The Morley/Ferro strips ran from December 31, 1945, to September 14, 1947.

Starting September 14, 1947, Johnson began scripting again, with Morley doing the art. Johnson assisted Morley by giving him specific layouts for each panel, and the credit "Jack Morley and CJ" was then used on the strip. The final story reached a conclusion on February 2, 1952.

== Revival and reprints ==
The strip was briefly revived, with adaptations of the early stories minus their World War II references, for a run from September 12, 1960, to April 14, 1962. These strips were redrawn in Johnson's style by Warren Sattler.

Barnaby received much critical praise when it first appeared, and it has been reprinted in Barnaby Quarterly (three issues, 1940s), by Henry Holt and Company (two hardcover books, with strips redrawn), Dover books (reprinting the first hardcover, 1960s), Ballantine Books (six paperbacks, 1980s) and Comics Revue magazine. These reprints still command high prices from used book dealers.

Fantagraphics published a five-volume series of collections designed by Daniel Clowes, reprinting the entire original run (1942–1952) of the strip. The first volume became available in June 2013, the fifth and final volume in March 2025.

== Theater ==
Jerome Chodorov wrote a stage adaptation, Barnaby and Mr. O'Malley, which was produced in 1946 by Barney Josephson and James D. Proctor. The play was not a success, with four total performances before it "closed for repairs", never to return. J. M. Kerrigan starred as O'Malley, Iris Mann played Jane, and Royal Dano had the role of the leprechaun Launcelot McSnoyd. Barnaby was portrayed by child actor Thomas William Hamilton, who would later become the namesake for the asteroid 4897 Tomhamilton.

The play was later adapted for television as a 1959 episode of the General Electric Theater, hosted by Ronald Reagan and starring Bert Lahr and Ron Howard.

== Bibliography ==

Key: Q1–Q3 = Barnaby Quarterly; B1–B2 = Holt hardbacks and their reprints; BB1–BB6 = Ballantine Books; S = Sunday strip, 60–62 = 1960–62 version; CR = Comics Revue; F1–F5 = Fantagraphics Books

=== 1942 ===
- 1. Mr. O'Malley, Q1, B1, BB1, S, 60, CR, F1
- 2. Blackout, BB1, F1
- 3. Spies, BB1, F1
- 4. Ogre, Q1, BB1, F1
- 5. Psychologist, Q1, B1, BB1, 60, CR, F1
- 6. Air Raid Warden, B1, BB1, F1
- 7. McSnoyd, Q2, B1, BB1, F1
- 8. Scrap Drive, Q2, B1, BB1, F1
- 9. Jane, Q2, B1, BB2, 60, CR, F1
- 10. Gorgon, Q2, B1, BB2, S, 61, CR, F1

=== 1943 ===
- 11. Gus, Q3, B1, BB2, S, 61, CR, F1
- 12. The Hot Coffee Ring, Q3, B1, BB2, 61, CR, F1
- 13. Quartet, Q3, B2, BB2, F1
- 14. Garden, B2, BB2, 61, CR, F1
- 15. Lion, B2, BB2, 61, CR, F1
- 16. Giant, B2, BB2, 61, CR, F1
- 17. Gorgon's Father, B2, BB2, 61, CR, F1
- 18. Kiddie Camp, BB2, F1
- 19. O'Malley for Congress, B2, BB3, F1
- 20. Investigating Santa, BB3, F1

=== 1944 ===
- 21. In Training, BB3, F2
- 22. Washington, BB3, F2
- 23. Book on Pixies, BB3, 61, CR, F2
- 24. Pop's Business, BB4, 61, CR, F2
- 25. Pirate Treasure, BB4, F2
- 26. Election 1944, BB4, F2
- 27. Thanksgiving, BB4, F2
- 28. Ermine Hunters, BB4, F2

=== 1945 ===
- 29. Soap Salesman, BB5, F2
- 30. Wizard of Wall Street, BB5, 62, CR, F2
- 31. Witch, BB5, F2
- 32. Aunt Minerva, BB5, F2
- 33. Thanksgiving Dinner, BB6, F2
- 34. Movie, BB6, F2

Crockett Johnson leaves the strip

=== 1946 ===
- 35. Lectures, BB6, F3, written by Ted Ferro, drawn by Jack Morley
- 36. Refrigerator Thief, BB6, F3
- 37. Baseball), BB6, F3
- 38. A House for Gorgon, F3
- 39. School Board, F3
- 40. A New Car, F3
- 41. A Chemical Set for Christmas, F3

=== 1947 ===
- 42. Shoes for Industry, F3
- 44. O'Malley's Brother Orville, F3
- 45. The Dog Show, F3
- 46. At the Beach, F3
- 47. Spraying, F3, Crockett Johnson writes some strips, which are signed Jack Morley and initialed CJ
- 48. A Visit to Aunt Minerva, F3, CJ

=== 1948 ===
- 49. The United Nations, F4, CJ
- 50. Mother Baxter's Swamp Oil Eyewash, F4, CJ
- 51. The License, F4, CJ
- 52. The Little Theater, F4, CJ
- 53. Kindergarten, F4, CJ
- 54. The Exorcism, F4, CJ
- 55. Jack Frost, F4, CJ

=== 1949 ===
- 56. Fafnir the Dragon, F4, CJ
- 57. The Hospital, F4
- 58. The Museum, F4
- 59. "The O'Malley Story", F4
- 60. The Beach, F4
- 61. College, F4
- 62. Television, F4
- 63. Pixies, F4

=== 1952 ===
- Final Story: The Birthday, CR 188
