= The World Is to Dig =

2026 studio album by They Might Be Giants

Studio album by They Might Be Giants
- Released: April 14, 2026
- Recorded: 2023–2025
- Studios: Reservoir Studios (Manhattan); Collyer Bros Studio (Brooklyn); Hello Studio (Sullivan County)
- Genre: Alternative rock
- Length: 44:28
- Label: Idlewild Records
- Producers: They Might Be Giants; Pat Dillett

They Might Be Giants chronology
Book (2021)	The World Is to Dig (2026)

Singles from The World Is to Dig
- 1. "Wu-Tang" Released: February 9, 2026; 2. "Sleep's Older Sister" Released: March 3, 2026; 3. "Outside Brain" Released: March 16, 2026; 4. "Overnight Sensation (Hit Record)" Released: March 31, 2026

The World Is to Dig is the 24th studio album by American alternative rock band They Might Be Giants, released on April 14, 2026. Prior to the album's release, the band released the singles "Wu-Tang", "Sleep's Older Sister", "Outside Brain", and "Overnight Sensation (Hit Record)". Songs on the album explore multiple genres and musical styles.

Many of the songs on The World Is to Dig were written and recorded in advance of the release of Book, the band's preceding album. As The World Is to Dig was recorded, They Might Be Giants changed earlier versions of the tracks to more up tempo versions. The World Is to Dig was completed in late 2025.

The name of the album was inspired by the title of A Hole Is to Dig, a 1952 children's book by author Ruth Krauss. The album's cover is mainly a painting of Yosemite Valley, credited to after Thomas Hill.

== Background ==
The World Is To Dig released five years after Book, the longest gap between studio albums in the band's career. According to the band, major reasons include the COVID-19 pandemic, a car crash which injured John Flansburgh, and an undisclosed health problem John Linnell was facing.

=== EP release ===
In early 2026, They Might Be Giants teased a new tour for the release of an EP titled Eyeball and for The World Is to Dig. The band released Eyeball as a "warm-up" to The World Is to Dig on January 15, 2026. After the release of the EP, John Linnell stated that Eyeball consists of songs left over from the creation process of The World Is to Dig: "Our favorite way of making records [...] is to write and record too many songs and then arrange the ones that work together as an album. We always have a bunch of good tracks left over to make an EP".

=== Title and cover art ===
The title of The World Is to Dig is inspired by the 1952 children's book A Hole Is to Dig, written by American author Ruth Krauss and illustrated by Maurice Sendak. The album's title is referencing a beatnik phrase to "dig" something rather than actually digging a hole. The cover art is a Hudson River School painting of Yosemite Valley credited to After Thomas Hill. The cover also includes an acorn illustration by Tony Millionaire.

== Recording and production ==
They Might Be Giants had already started working on The World Is to Dig before Book was released. By early 2023, ten songs had been recorded and tracked for the album as part of what Creative Loafing described as the band's regular process of "recording 20–30 tracks and later selecting the best ones to include".

They Might Be Giants recorded the final version of The World Is to Dig over the course of a year. Throughout the time, the band replaced songs from earlier versions of the album with more up tempo tracks for the release. In early 2025, the album was almost complete, though They Might Be Giants decided to continue working on it by adding new material, remixing, and moving songs around. Production on the album all but finished as of December 2025, pending only minor additional work.

== Style and composition ==
=== Tracks 1–9 ===
The opening track, "Back In Los Angeles", was described by Spectrum Culture as having "a lovely, dramatic string arrangement and lyrics that are an archly observed, slightly acidic but not unaffectionate East Coast outsiders' portrait of L.A. It's strangely elegiac and subdued for an opening song, but in itself that's refreshing..."

John Linnell stated that he wrote the lead single "Wu-Tang" as a celebration of the Wu-Tang Clan but in the form of a completely unrelated genre from the hip-hop collective; Stereogum described the song's genre as power pop. The Harvard Crimson stated that the harmony between John Linnell and John Flansburgh in "Wu-Tang" provides a similar feeling to earlier They Might Be Giants songs, such as "Subliminal". John Flansburgh stated in a Chronogram interview that "Wu-Tang" is "about fandom—how you can get swept up in something in a very real way. The narrator isn't necessarily us. [...] There are people out there who are deeply, sincerely into things—Wu-Tang included. That intensity is real, even if the premise seems funny".

The Daily Iowan stated that the single "Sleep's Older Sister" "was a gentler groove through a curious, lucid dream space. It chronicles a love affair with dreams, which the speaker laments are too expensive now".

"Je N'en Ai Pas" is written with lyrics entirely in French and includes French phrases which John Linnell learned. Its title roughly translates to "I've got nothing" in English. The Daily Iowan described "Je N'en Ai Pas" as having "an interesting zag to 'Sleep [Older Sister]'s' zig".

The Far Out Magazine stated that the single "Outside Brain" is "1990s nostalgia rampant throughout all forms of the cultural sphere" and "build[s] upon the Brooklyn duo's distinctive alt-rock twang, bridging the gap between their golden age output and more recent offerings".

The Daily Iowan continued by stating that "Let's Fall in Lava" "was a slower ballad about how dangerous it can feel to fall in love. 'What would Terminator 2 feel if he could feel' was the standout lyric".

Spectrum Culture described that "[t]he minute-long 'Telescope,' which could almost be from one of their children's albums [...] has [a] clunky junkyard texture..." Spectrum Culture continued with that "'Garbage In' is similarly catchy [...] [and] seems to be about a zombie apocalypse". They also stated that "'Get Down' is dramatic, horn-bolstered espionage-funk and one of the most old-style TMBG tracks on the album, but lyrically it's inconsequentially rather than loveably silly".

=== Tracks 10–18 ===
Spectrum Culture stated that "New Wave Will Never Die" "has a nice, hushed, slinky melody but feels like a joke in search of a punchline, where their best songs are funny all the way through without seeming to strain for more".

The World Is to Dig includes a cover of 1974 single "Overnight Sensation (Hit Record)" by American pop rock band the Raspberries. From Rotate Magazine, John Linnell stated that "Overnight Sensation (Hit Record)" has had a lasting impact on him that resonated. He continued by stating that he heard "the track on AM radio during his youth" and that "revisiting its themes [...] brings a sense of irony and renewed appreciation" to him.

The Daily Iowan stated that "Character Flaw" has a "chorus [that is] extremely catchy, [and] the story it tells was amusing enough to incite an audible laugh — that of a blatantly flawed individual..." AllMusic described "Hit the Ground" as "sound[ing] like a cover [song]" and being a "vintage soul homage".

Spectrum Culture stated that "What You Get" is "lighter than a philosophical song about accepting your life and its boundaries has any right to be..." AllMusic explained that "Slow" "conveys the dissolution of time" and has "mind-bending microtones". Spectrum Culture stated that "In the Dead Mall" is a "portrait of a mall past its prime", and that "[a]t their most likeable, the Johns write lines that immediately have the listener anticipating what the rhyme will be, as in the fuzzy rock 'n' roll of 'What the Cat Dragged In'".

Spectrum Culture continued with how "[t]he closing 'They Might Be Feral' satirizes small town conservatism – admittedly an easy target – without being overbearing or self-righteous and is a good bit of power pop".

== Release ==
The album's lead single, "Wu-Tang", was released on February 9, 2026, alongside the announcement of the The World Is to Dig and the reveal of its title. On March 3, 2026, They Might Be Giants released The World Is to Dig single "Sleep's Older Sister", which was followed by the release of the single "Outside Brain" on March 16, 2026. On March 31, 2026, the band released the cover of "Overnight Sensation (Hit Record)" as a single.

The World Is to Dig was released as a digital download on April 10, 2026, followed by its release on CD, LP, cassette, and streaming services on April 14, 2026.

On April 17, within days of the release, They Might Be Giants launched The Bigger Show Tour in support of both The World Is to Dig and the Eyeball EP. The Bigger Show Tour is also an extension of the previous Big Show Tour, and features the same eight-piece band; this includes a three-piece horn section that had performed on both works, Book, and homecoming concerts dating back decades.

== Reception ==
Professional ratings
Review scores
Source	Rating
AllMusic	4/5 stars
Exclaim!	7/10 stars
New Noise Magazine	4/5 stars
The Arts Desk	3/5 stars

AllMusic stated that "[f]orty years after their self-titled debut, They Might Be Giants are just as dedicated to making sharply observed songs that roam the musical map", giving the album a 4/5.

Exclaim! gave The World Is to Dig a 7/10, stating that though the album has "plenty of wonderfully weird gems", the Johns "don't quite manage to go 18 for 18. 'Telescope' is a skippable 60-second detour, the warped production of 'Slow' is cloying, and 'Let's Fall in Lava' is a one-note joke".

The Arts Desk stated that, while listening to The World Is to Dig, they were "balancing moments of enjoyment with reasons to be disappointed", giving the album a 3/5.

New Noise Magazine rated the album 4/5 stating that "[s]ongs like 'Get Down' showcase [The Johns'] musical sensibilities" and that The World Is to Dig is "pure fun from start to finish".

Spectrum Culture stated that although "[t]here are few fillers on The World [I]s to Dig's 18 tracks", there are a lot of good songs.

The Daily Iowan stated that although "[...] the [last] five songs — while enjoyable — don't quite have the same lyrical or musical prowess as the album's best tracks", they enjoyed the singles and multiple songs throughout.

== Track listing ==
All tracks written by They Might Be Giants, except "Overnight Sensation (Hit Record)" by Eric Carmen.

No.	Title	Length
1.	"Back in Los Angeles"	2:41
2.	"Wu-Tang"	3:09
3.	"Sleep's Older Sister"	2:29
4.	"Je N'en Ai Pas"	2:13
5.	"Outside Brain"	2:01
6.	"Let's Fall in Lava"	2:06
7.	"Telescope"	0:59
8.	"Garbage In"	2:39
9.	"Get Down"	2:47
10.	"New Wave Will Never Die"	2:36
11.	"Overnight Sensation (Hit Record)"	3:30
12.	"Character Flaw"	2:51
13.	"Hit the Ground"	2:30
14.	"What You Get"	2:48
15.	"Slow"	2:21
16.	"In the Dead Mall"	2:07
17.	"What the Cat Dragged In"	2:05
18.	"They Might Be Feral"	2:36
Total length:		44:28

== Personnel ==
They Might Be Giants

- John Flansburgh – vocals, guitar
- John Linnell – vocals, keyboard
- Dan Miller – guitar
- Danny Weinkauf – bass
- Marty Beller – drums
- Stan Harrison – saxophone (Note: Tracks 9, 12, and 17)
- Mark Pender – trumpet
- Dan Levine – trombone

Additional musicians

- Maxim Moston – violin (Note: Track 1)
- Katie Kresek – violin
- Urbano Sanchez – percussion (Note: Track 10)

Production

- Patrick Dillett – production
- They Might Be Giants – production
- Mixed by Patrick Dillett
- Engineered by Thom Beemer, Peter Jensen, and James Yost

Artwork

- Tony Millionaire – acorn illustration
- After Thomas Hill – cover painting
