= Philadelphia Art Alliance =

Arts center in Philadelphia

The Philadelphia Art Alliance at University of the Arts
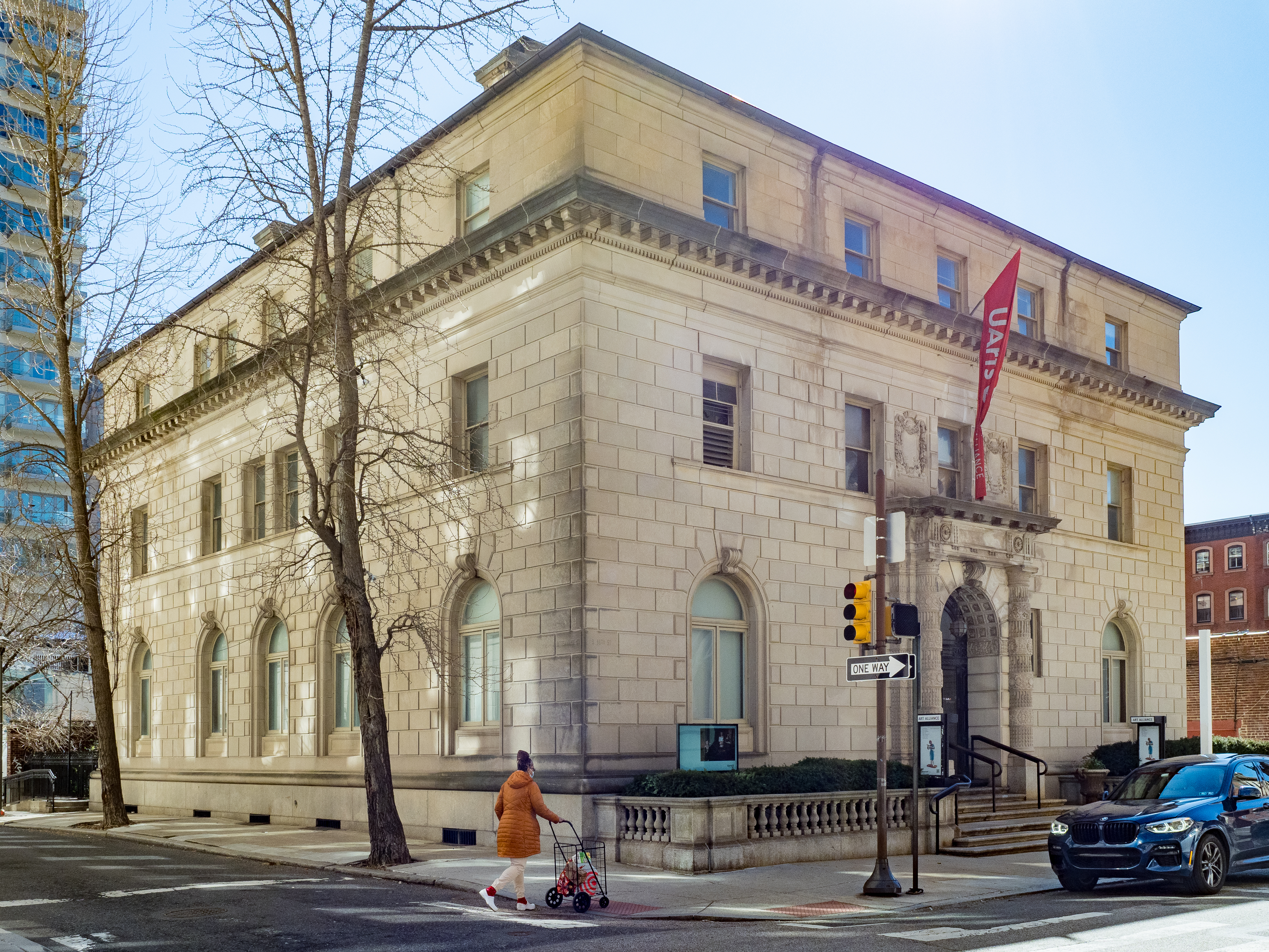
- Wetherill mansion, built 1906
- Former name: The Philadelphia Art Alliance
- Established: 1915
- Dissolved: 2024
- Location: 251 South 18th Street; Philadelphia, Pennsylvania, U.S.
- Coordinates: 39.94821°N 75.17090°W
- Website: www.Uarts/ArtAlliance^{(Archived 28 July 2024)}

Philadelphia Register of Historic Places
- Designated: April 28, 1970

The Philadelphia Art Alliance at University of the Arts was a multidisciplinary arts center located in the Rittenhouse Square section of Philadelphia, Pennsylvania. It was the oldest multidisciplinary arts center in the United States for visual, literary and performing arts. In June 2024 the Alliance's parent institution, the University of the Arts, abruptly closed.

== History ==
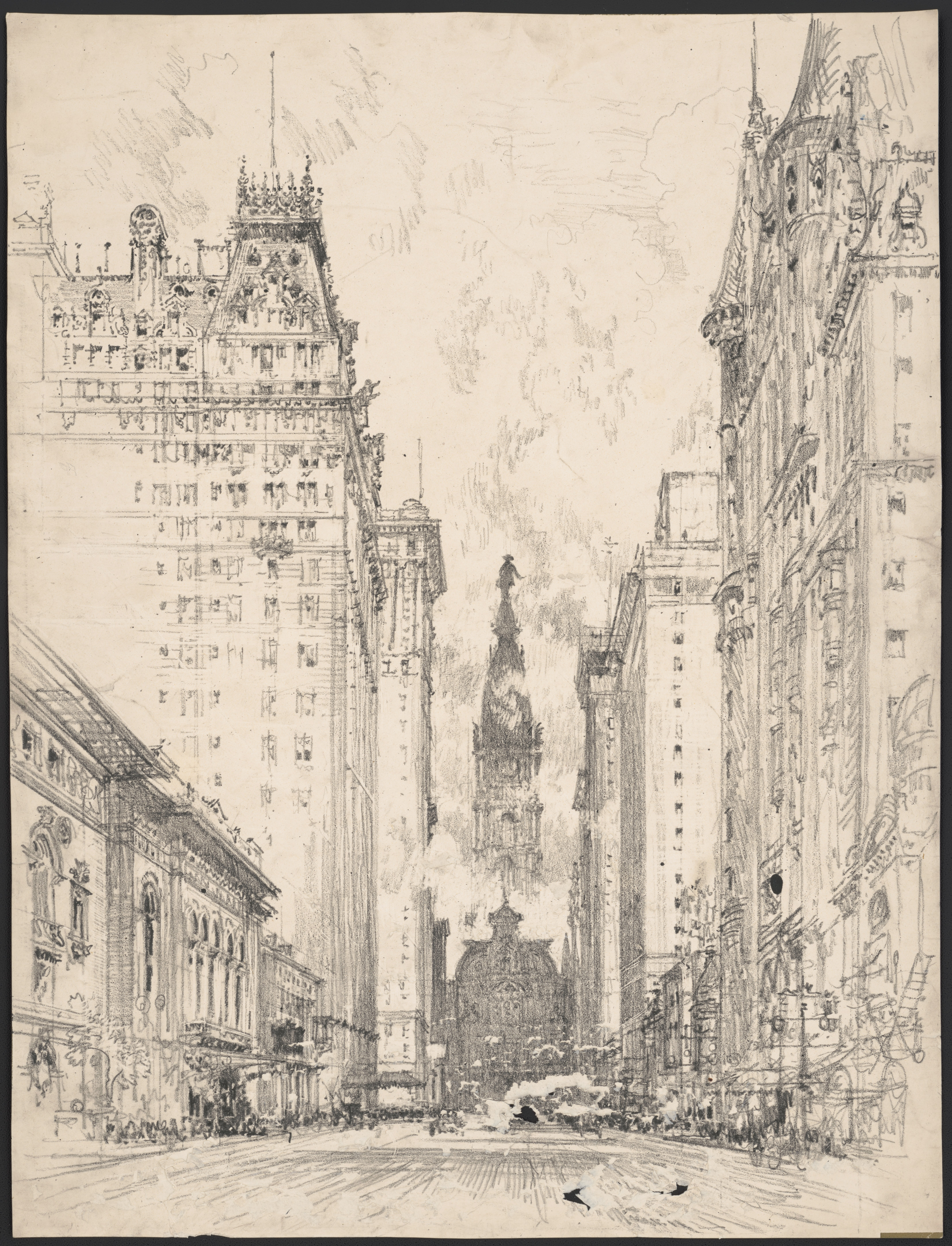
Broad Street, a 1915 lithograph of the Philadelphia Art Alliance

Founded in 1915 by theater aficionado and philanthropist Christine Wetherill Stevenson, the Philadelphia Art Alliance was awarded its charter of operations on September 27, 1915 by Judge Ferguson in Philadelphia's Court of Common Pleas No. 3. At the time, the organization had fifty members.

In December 1915, the alliance purchased property at 1823-25 Walnut Street in the Rittenhouse Square section of Philadelphia, where members initially planned to establish the organization's headquarters. Models of the alliance's proposed building designs were displayed at the Philadelphia Today and Tomorrow Civic Exposition that was held in the auditorium building of the Commercial Museum in Philadelphia from May 15 to June 10, 1916. Alliance members hoped that their new building would ultimately come to be known as the "Art Center of America."

In January 1917, the alliance launched a new series of "sociable luncheons" that were designed to familiarize prominent men and women in the Philadelphia region with fine arts and music trends. The first speaker was Olga Samaroff, an American pianist and music critic who was married to Leopold Stokowski, conductor of the Philadelphia Orchestra. Samaroff, who was well known to the alliance and residents of the Philadelphia region from her work on the alliance's music committee, presented a lecture on "The Correlation of Music and the Fine Arts."

In 1924, the alliance formed a businessmen's art club to encourage businessmen in the region to pursue amateur studies in painting and sculpture in order to develop a greater appreciation of art while also benefitting from hands-on creation activities as a form of relaxation.

In 1925, the alliance awarded the Eurydice Chorus Award to Franz Bornschein of the Peadbody Conservatory of Music for his setting of Percy Bysshe Shelley's Arethusa to music for performance by women's voices.

By the end of the decade, the alliance's membership roster numbered 2,500.

In 1930, members of the executive committee of the alliance caused controversy when they cancelled a Philadelphia Art Society invitation-to-exhibit that had been extended to New York sculptor Antonio Salemme, and returned his large black bronze figure of African American actor-singer-activist Paul Robeson. In a letter written on behalf of the alliance by Prix de Rome-winning sculptor Walter Hancock, Hancock provided the following explanation for the executive committee's decision:

"It did not of course, occur to us that there would be any objection to showing a nude figure of a well-known person. The executive committee, however, expressed their apprehension of the consequences of exhibiting such a figure in a public square, especially the figure of a Negro, as te colored problem seems to be unusually great in Philadelphia."

Hancock also stated that the exhibition's director had asked that Salemme considered sending a different piece to the same juried exhibition to replace the rejected Robeson figure, adding: "You may imagine how much I regret to have to convey this request to you, since I have always tremendously admired the Robeson statue and was one of those who especially urged that it be invited, but I hope you will understand the position of the Sculptors' Committee and favor us with such other contributions as you may see fit to send." The statue in question had previously been exhibited, without controversy, in the Palace of the Legion of Honor in San Francisco, California and was on display at the Brooklyn Museum in New York at the time of news reports about the incident. Several alliance members reportedly resigned in response to the executive committee's decision.

In 1937, the alliance loaned fifty-two paintings by Pennsylvania artists to the State Museum of Pennsylvania in Harrisburg for a summer exhibition.

Philadelphia Art Alliance members also exhibited their work at other venues across the United States. In 1944, John J. Dull's watercolors were featured in a spring art show at Texas Christian University.

On March 13, 1958, alliance president Laurence H. Eldredge announced at the organization's annual dinner that Mary Louise (Curtis) Bok Zimbalist, founder of Philadelphia's Curtis Institute of Music, had been awarded the Philadelphia Art Alliance Medal of Achievement for "advancement of or outstanding achievement in the arts."

In December 1959, the alliance hosted the Contemporary Israeli Art Exhibition, which featured fifty-eight paintings from across the spectrum of western art.

In January 1968, alliance president Raymond S. Green presented actress Helen Hayes with the Philadelphia Art Alliance Award of Merit "in recognition of outstanding creative work of high artistic merit." Hayes, who had been given the nickname "First Lady of American Theatre," was chosen unanimously for the award by the alliance's drama committee and board of directors, according to alliance executive director James Kirk Merrick who noted, "This award isn't given every year.... It is only presented when we feel someone is deserving. I don't think there can be any question as to how we arrived at choosing Miss Hayes."

The alliance was housed in the historic Wetherill mansion, which was designed in 1906 by Frank Miles Day and constructed by Thomas M. Seeds Jr. The building was listed on the Philadelphia Register of Historic Places on April 28, 1970, and is also listed on the National Register of Historic Places as part of the Rittenhouse National Register Historic District. The alliance hosted art exhibits, theater and music workshops, poetry readings, lectures, concerts and recitals.

== Merger with the University of the Arts ==
The Philadelphia Art Alliance officially merged and was acquired by the University of the Arts in 2018, after unanimous approval from the boards of both institutions in 2017, and became known as The Philadelphia Art Alliance at University of the Arts. Although the University officially closed on June 7, 2024 the organizers of an already-installed exhibit at the Art Alliance received permission to open as scheduled from June 14 to August 9.

== Building ==
Upon the bankruptcy and closure of University of the Arts a large real estate portfolio was divested. The Weatherill mansion building previously owned by the Philadelphia Art Alliance was sold to Curtis Institute of Music. Other interested parties was Temple University and real estate investor Allan Domb, although the courts ruled that he could not pursue the purchase as the building had to be used for educational endeavors.

In the early morning of July 4, 2025, the building suffered a fire causing significant damage.
