= Mr. O'Malley =

Fictional character in Barnaby

Mr. O'Malley was a character in the comic strip Barnaby, by cartoonist Crockett Johnson. He was the fairy godfather of five-year-old Barnaby.

Jackeen J. O'Malley first appeared in response to Barnaby's wish for a fairy godmother. He was a 3-foot-high (0.91 m), cigar smoking man with an overcoat and four tiny pink wings, and was a member of the Elves, Leprechauns, Gnomes, and Little Men's Chowder & Marching Society. His magic wand was the stub of his half-smoked Havana cigar.

Mr. O'Malley's conceit was matched only by his inability to grant the simplest childhood request, and his misguided attempts never failed to get Barnaby into hot water.

Mr. O'Malley was a comic strip original, though in appearance he had a passing resemblance to W.C. Fields. "Cushlamochree" (from the Irish cuisle mo chroí, "beat of my heart") was his signature cry when shocked by the inevitable down-turn of events in response to his ineffectual meddling in Barnaby's affairs. Throughout the course of his comic career Mr. O'Malley stumbled his way into the U.S. Congress and became a Wall Street tycoon.

== Other media ==
"Barnaby and Mr. O'Malley", a 1946 stage play based on the comic, featured J. M. Kerrigan as O'Malley. The play was unsuccessful, completing only four performances before it "closed for repairs", never to return. The play was later adapted into a 1959 episode of General Electric Theater, starring Bert Lahr as O'Malley. Many of the original comic strips were republished in three volumes of paperback books.

== In popular culture ==
In 1944, then-Major General Keller E. Rockey, commander of the 5th Marine Division, named his Jeep "O'Malley," after the cartoon character.
