= 7th Heaven season 9 =

7th Heaven
- Season 9
- DVD cover
- No. of episodes: 22

Release
- Original network: The WB
- Original release: September 13, 2004 – May 23, 2005

Season chronology
- ← Previous; Season 8 Next → Season 10

The ninth season of 7th Heaven—an American family-drama television series, created and produced by Brenda Hampton—premiered on September 13, 2004, on The WB, and concluded on May 23, 2005 (22 episodes).

== Cast and characters ==
=== Main ===
- Stephen Collins as Eric Camden
- Catherine Hicks as Annie Camden
- Beverley Mitchell as Lucy Camden-Kinkirk
- Barry Watson as Matt Camden (10 episodes)
- David Gallagher as Simon Camden (14 episodes)
- Mackenzie Rosman as Ruthie Camden
- Nikolas and Lorenzo Brino as Sam and David Camden
- George Stults as Kevin Kinkirk
- Tyler Hoechlin as Martin Brewer (21 episodes)
- Happy as Happy the Dog

=== Recurring ===
- Geoff Stults as Ben Kinkirk (3 episodes)
- Thomas Dekker as Vincent (9 episodes)
- Rheagan Wallace as Georgia Huffington (5 episodes)
- Kyle Searles as Mac (10 episodes)
- Katie Cassidy as Zoe (4 episodes)

== Episodes ==
No. overall	No. in season	Title	Directed by	Written by	Original release date	Prod. code	Viewers (millions)
178	1	"Dropping Trou" (Part 1)	Joel J. Feigenbaum	Brenda Hampton	September 13, 2004	62006-09-178	7.26
Simon appears to be getting extremely close to his new girlfriend Georgia (Rheagan Wallace) and Eric and Annie think they're having sex and are spurred to grill Simon about it. When the truth finally comes out, they're scandalized and try to follow the couple when they're out to dinner at a fancy restaurant. Meanwhile, Kevin worries that mother-to-be Lucy is in denial about her pregnancy when she refuses to shop for maternity clothes though her pants keep falling down; Matt returns for a visit and gets pulled into the family drama, especially the Simon/Georgia situation, which he feels his parents aren't handling right; new high-school freshman Ruthie gets in trouble pranking Martin at school, and the twins find trouble on their first day of kindergarten. To be continued...
179	2	"The Best Laid Plans" (Part 2)	Harry Harris	Brenda Hampton	September 20, 2004	62006-09-179	6.65
A fed-up Simon is reluctant to talk to his parents about his relationship with Georgia after Eric and Annie crash their fancy-restaurant date, but he admits that they're having sex and he's currently on disciplinary probation at college for skipping classes to be with her, but he's still maintaining an A-average. Eric feels inspired to install an abstinence-only program at church, and Lucy eagerly agrees, but with a few conditions. Also, Lucy and Kevin learn their baby's sex and Lucy questions her ability to be a good mother; Matt is worried that Martin is still brokenhearted over Cecilia and will tell her about Simon's new relationship, but Martin is on other issues; Matt chips away at Ruthie's unwillingness to apologize to Martin about pranking him but her growing attitude problem gets him nowhere.
180	3	"The Song of Lucy"	Joel J. Feigenbaum	Sue Tenney	September 27, 2004	62006-09-180	6.53
Although she is worried about the lesson plan for the abstinence class she is teaching at church, Lucy is excited when Eric tells her she is now the Associate Pastor and will give her first sermon on Sunday. Meanwhile, Simon begins to see Eric's former therapist Dr. Gibson (David Piel) to help deal with some personal issues. During one of the sessions Simon realizes he has been using his relationship with Georgia to block out the guilt he still feels about the fatal car accident. Lastly, Ruthie falls for a guy she meets in detention, Harry (Aaron Carter), a foster kid currently living in a county facility. Despite Eric's approval, Martin has reservations and keeps a watchful eye on the couple when Harry comes to the house.
181	4	"Bad Boys, Bad Boys, Whatcha Gonna Do?"	Michael Preece	Elaine Arata	October 4, 2004	62006-09-181	7.36
Simon comes to terms with his fears over the accident and goes bike-riding with Justin; Ruthie and Harry decide to break up; Lucy counsels a pregnant girl.
182	5	"Vote"	Joel J. Feigenbaum	Chris Olsen	October 11, 2004	62006-09-182	5.87
After seeing how much Martin knows about world politics, Ruthie is on a mission to develop her own opinions on the topic. Meanwhile, Eric and Annie each suspect that the other didn't vote in the previous U.S. presidential election; amidst the pressure of registering to vote, Lucy realizes that Kevin isn't registered in their area either; as Eric tries to teach the twins the importance of voting in America, he constantly reminds the whole family to vote on Election Day.
183	6	"Fathers"	Harry Harris	Jeff Olsen	October 18, 2004	62006-09-183	6.61
Eric seeks help from Mary's former boyfriend Wilson West (Andrew Keegan), when new teen father Charlie (Eric Panler) tells him he made a terrible mistake and can't handle the responsibility of fatherhood; Kevin's brother Ben (Geoff Stults) comes to town and takes an unusual interest in Lucy's pregnancy, siding with her when she and Kevin argue over which OB/GYN doctor they prefer; Ruthie has hidden intentions for wanting to hang out with Martin and his best friend Mac (Kyle Searles), but ends up disappointed.
184	7	"Regret to Inform"	Harvey Laidman	Jeffrey Rodgers	October 25, 2004	62006-09-184	6.62
When Kevin purposely leads Venus (Martha Plimpton) to believe that Martin is a rookie police officer, she quickly expresses interest in him and invites him to her house, and Mac encourages him to pursue her. Martin has a hard time revealing the truth about himself after he learns that Venus' father is serving in the Middle East. Meanwhile, Eric and Annie are worried that Martin is getting in over his head with Venus and enlist Kevin to fix things, which only leads to rumors around the police station that Kevin is cheating on Lucy. Mac also spreads rumors about Martin at school when Venus shows up there for work. Lastly, Ben continues to hide his relationship with Lucy's new baby doctor, although they spend a weekend together.
185	8	"Why Not Me?"	Joel J. Feigenbaum	Sue Tenney	November 1, 2004	62006-09-185	6.51
Kevin learns that Simon has been kicked out of his dorm room for allowing a girl named Christina to stay overnight; Simon asks for the family's help in finding a new place for him and Christina, and Eric steps in to handle it when it gets more complicated.
186	9	"Thanksgiving"	Harry Harris	Sue Tenney	November 15, 2004	62006-09-186	6.71
Two weeks before Thanksgiving, Eric and the kids notice that Annie is acting strange, especially after she learns that Matt and Sarah (guest-star Sarah Danielle Madison) won't be able to spend the holidays in Glenoak; then she isn't pleased when they show up early to spend time with the family before the holiday. Most of the family have their own Thanksgiving plans, and Eric worries how Annie will take the news: Carlos (Carlos Ponce) telephones to say that he, Mary, and baby Charles are spending the holiday in Puerto Rico with Carlos' family and want Ruthie to join them; Simon decides to stay at school for work, nervous about telling his parents something about him and Georgia; Martin plans to go camping with Mac; and strong-willed, pregnant Lucy is determined to do the cooking and decorating this year.
187	10	"Gratitude"	Fred Einesman	Fred Einesman	November 22, 2004	62006-09-187	7.52
Simon tries to figure out how to tell his parents Georgia's pregnant, unaware that there's more to the story; on the way back from Thanksgiving with Ginger, Eric and Annie reminisce about their time together; Lucy collapses at the grocery store while shopping with Matt and they can't track down Kevin; Ruthie isn't having the best time in Puerto Rico.
188	11	"Wayne's World"	Joel J. Feigenbaum	Sue Tenney	November 29, 2004	62006-09-188	6.88
Lucy is stuck on bedrest and the entire family is stuck with her foul mood, especially as she tries to complete her final paper for school; Martin's attitude causes problems with his teachers, friends, and coaches, and Ruthie thinks she knows what's causing it; Wayne Newton makes a surprise appearance on the Camdens' doorstep to deliver one of them an important message.
189	12	"Paper or Plastic?"	Michael Preece	Brenda Hampton & Jeffrey Rodgers	January 24, 2005	62006-09-189	7.99
Matt finally offers to sneak frustrated Lucy out of the house for the afternoon so the family can prepare a baby shower for her, but nobody expects her to go into labor in the mall elevator; Ruthie spoils Kevin's extravagant surprise for Lucy by giving her honest opinion of it.
190	13	"The Fine Art of Parenting"	Harry Harris	Teleplay by : Justin Trofholz; Story by : Brenda Hampton	January 31, 2005	62006-09-190	6.64
Kevin and Lucy move back into the Camden house, which means they will have much help with their newborn baby Savannah, but Lucy clashes with both her husband and her mother about some of their parenting decisions and Eric thinks he and Annie are taking on too much as grandparents; a female classmate of Martin's spreads a false rumor about them and Ruthie uses it to get what she wants from him; Vincent comes to the house to speak to Eric about dating Ruthie.
191	14	"First Date"	Joel J. Feigenbaum	Courtney Turk & Kelley Turk	February 7, 2005	62006-09-191	6.91
Ruthie is thrilled when her parents reluctantly agree to let her go on her first official date with Vincent; with a mixture of emotion and typical Camden chaos, the entire family helps her prepare.
192	15	"Red Socks"	Michael Preece	Martha Plimpton	February 14, 2005	62006-09-192	5.10
In this special musical episode, the Camdens get into the Valentine's Day spirit by performing classic hits; Lucy is irritated that Kevin is working on the holiday; after not hearing from Vincent for three days, Ruthie catches him with another girl; the family celebrates the twins' sixth birthday.
193	16	"Brotherly Love"	Barry Watson	Brenda Hampton	February 21, 2005	62006-09-193	5.50
Matt is upset when Simon wants him to prescribe birth-control pills for him and his new girlfriend, and rumors sweep through the house as the two brothers talk secretly; the previous owner of Lucy and Kevin's new house asks them to sell it back to him; the older Camden kids hide a huge secret about Mary from their parents, who are furious that Kevin is storing a gun in the house.
194	17	"Tangled Web We Weave"	Joel J. Feigenbaum	Brenda Hampton	February 28, 2005	62006-09-194	5.57
Simon panics when his girlfriend admits to having an STD the morning after they've slept together; Martin and Mac catch Ruthie's boyfriend with another girl; Matt, Simon, Lucy, and Ruthie agonize over telling their parents about Mary, whom Annie falsely believes is pregnant again.
195	18	"Honor Thy Mother"	Harry Harris	Victoria Huff	April 25, 2005	62006-09-195	5.35
Non-parishioner Marie Wagner wants Eric to get her elderly mother into a nursing home, but when Eric meets Mrs. Wagner he sees that she's still very capable and Marie is the one who needs help as she's unhappy with her life; later Mrs. Wagner's stress over her daughter lands her in the emergency room. Meanwhile, the family spends the day preparing a special family dinner in honor of Grandma Jenny's 75th birthday, and Ruthie fights with Lucy while shopping because she wants to spend the day with Vincent without Annie knowing; Ben arrives in Glenoak and makes himself comfortable in the garage apartment, but Kevin isn't happy because he wanted his mother and her new husband to be the first to meet Savannah.
196	19	"Hungry"	Joel J. Feigenbaum	Elaine Arata	May 2, 2005	62006-09-196	4.89
After Vincent's (Thomas Dekker) new girlfriend Margot (Ashley Benson) taunts Ruthie for wearing second-hand clothes, distraught Ruthie bursts into the bathroom to find Martin's girlfriend Zoe (Katie Cassidy) recovering from a fainting spell. Zoe confides that her father doesn't have enough money for food and makes Ruthie promise not to tell anyone; later, when Martin breaks up with her because he doesn't like her conceited attitude, Zoe thinks Ruthie has betrayed her. Meanwhile, Kevin wants alone time with Lucy and is frustrated with her obsession over Savannah; Eric and Annie suspect that Sam and David are feigning being sick so they can stay up late and eat sweets, and Sam is jealous of the attention ailing David gets. Note: Towards the end of the episode, about several high school students broke the 4th wall, looked at the camera & talked to the TV audience about being poor, hungry, and being on EBT/food stamps.
197	20	"Leaps of Faith"	Ron High	Jeffrey Rodgers	May 9, 2005	62006-09-197	4.76
An extremely-nervous Simon comes home to Glenoak to await the results of his STD test. Eric counsels a mother (Erika Alexander) of two daughters (Bree' Anna Banks, Brandi Vanice) with sickle-cell anemia whose absent father (Victor Love) wants to take them back with him to Memphis, Tennessee for treatment at St. Jude Children's Research Hospital. Meanwhile, Ruthie's ex-boyfriend Peter (Scotty Leavenworth) and his parents Paris and Vic (Bryan Callen, Shannon Kenny), who are expecting and want Eric to marry them, visit the Camdens, creating problems for Ruthie and current boyfriend Vincent; Lucy and Kevin disagree over who should look after Savannah when Lucy returns to work; when Martin misses an important call from his father in Iraq while out with Zoe, he has second thoughts about their relationship
198	21	"Mi Familia" (Part 1)	Joel J. Feigenbaum	Sue Tenney	May 16, 2005	62006-09-198	4.91
Matt doesn't know how to break the awful news to his parents that Mary has filed for divorce and signed away custody of her son; Simon informs new girlfriend Rose (Sarah Thompson), that he will not have sex with her, but avoids explaining why not; she gets fed up then returns to him when she learns his true intentions for them: marriage. Meanwhile, Vincent asks Martin to break up with Ruthie; Lucy and Kevin might have finally found their perfect house--just in time, as Kevin is frustrated that they haven't moved out of the Camdens' yet; and Cecilia's parents George and Gwen (Brad Maule and Holly Fulger) want to adopt Danny Davis (Drake Johnston), then when they discover that he has three sisters in Social Services, they decide to take them in also.
199	22	"Mi Familia" (Part 2)	Joel J. Feigenbaum	Sue Tenney	May 23, 2005	62006-09-199	5.54
When Simon and Rose come to Glenoak to meet each other's parents, Annie suspects that their relationship is serious and forbids them to sleep in the same room in her house; Rose objects, then reluctantly acquiesces. Meanwhile, Eric hides Mary's divorce news from Annie; Martin becomes the fifth wheel in Ruthie and Vincent's relationship; the Davis siblings' biological mother objects to Cecilia's parents' attempt to adopt them; Martin's father returns from Iraq.
