= 7th Heaven season 11 =

7th Heaven
- Season 11
- DVD cover
- No. of episodes: 22

Release
- Original network: The CW
- Original release: September 25, 2006 – May 13, 2007

Season chronology
- ← Previous; Season 10

The eleventh and final season of 7th Heaven—an American family-drama television series, created and produced by Brenda Hampton. It premiered on September 25, 2006, on The CW, and concluded on May 13, 2007 (22 episodes). It is the final season of the series. Stephen Collins, Catherine Hicks, Beverley Mitchell, and Mackenzie Rosman are the only cast members to star in all eleven seasons of the series, along with Happy the dog.

== Cast and characters ==
=== Main ===
- Stephen Collins as Eric Camden
- Catherine Hicks as Annie Camden (19 episodes)
- Beverley Mitchell as Lucy Camden-Kinkirk
- Mackenzie Rosman as Ruthie Camden (16 episodes)
- Nikolas and Lorenzo Brino as Sam and David Camden
- George Stults as Kevin Kinkirk (18 episodes)
- Tyler Hoechlin as Martin Brewer
- Haylie Duff as Sandy Jameson
- Happy the Dog as herself

=== Recurring ===
- Colton James as Theodore "T-Bone" Jr (18 episodes)
- Sarah Wright as Jane (18 episodes)
- Andrea Morris as Margaret (18 episodes)
- Kyle Searles as Mac (12 episodes)

== Production ==
After much deliberation within the now-defunct WB network, it was made public in November 2005 that season ten would be the program's final because of high costs, which were revealed to be due to a poorly negotiated licensing agreement by the WB network a few years earlier. The program's future was hanging in the balance and it was entirely in the hands of the newly established CW network whether to renew it for an additional season. In March 2006, the main cast of characters were approached about the possibility of returning for another season.

After further consideration by the CW network, it was decided three days after the airing of its "series finale", that 7th Heaven would be picked up for an eleventh season, which would air on their network in the Monday-night slot that had helped make it famous. Originally the show was renewed for thirteen episodes, but on September 18, 2006, the renewal was extended to a full twenty-two episodes.

Along with the show's unexpected and last-minute renewal came some changes. First, David Gallagher choose not to return as Simon. Then, the show's already-low budget was moderately trimmed, forcing cuts in the salaries of some cast members and shortened taping schedules (seven days per episode instead of the typical eight).Furthermore, Mackenzie Rosman, who played youngest daughter Ruthie, did not appear in the first six episodes. Catherine Hicks missed three episodes in season 11, as another cost-cutting move. Additionally, George Stults was absent for a few episodes at the beginning of season 11.

Also, after airing Monday nights at 8/7c for ten seasons, plus the first two episodes of season 11, the CW unexpectedly moved 7th Heaven to Sunday nights as of October 15, 2006. The Sunday/Monday lineup swap was attributed to mediocre ratings of shows on both nights. While 7th Heaven did improve in numbers over the CW's previous Sunday night programming, it never quite hit its Monday-night momentum again, and the shows that replaced it in its slot on Monday night never matched what it had achieved in that time slot.

== Episodes ==
| No. overall | No. in season | Title | Directed by | Written by | Original release date | Prod. code | Viewers (millions) |
|---|---|---|---|---|---|---|---|
| 222 | 1 | "Turn, Turn, Turn" | Joel J. Feigenbaum | Caroline Kepnes | September 25, 2006 | 62006-11-222 | 4.19 |
Lucy and Kevin cope with an unexpected tragedy, then Lucy, still emotionally fragile, convinces Eric to let her deliver next Sunday's sermon. Meanwhile, Martin suggests to Sandy that they marry and build a family for their son, then becomes angry when he realizes why she's holding back; Annie can't shake the feeling that something's terribly wrong with Eric; and Ruthie is studying in Scotland.
| 223 | 2 | "And Tonight's Specials Are…" | Keith Truesdell | Brenda Hampton | October 2, 2006 | 62006-11-223 | 4.17 |
Tension mounts in Lucy and Kevin's marriage as she pulls away emotionally, spends increasing amounts of time at the movie theater, and even starts pouring her heart out to a teenage boy who works there. Back at home, Annie urges Kevin to not give up on Lucy, and Eric isn't thrilled with his twin sons' new name for him, but it's nothing compared to his run-in with their very young teacher.
| 224 | 3 | "A Pain in the Neck" | Michael Preece | Brenda Hampton | October 15, 2006 | 62006-11-224 | 3.17 |
Annie heads to Buffalo to help Mary with her newborn twin daughters; left to take care of things at home, Eric--who is experiencing excruciating neck pain--pulls the twins out of school without consulting Annie after a difficult issue with their 3rd-grade teacher. Kevin's brother Ben arrives for a visit, but there's only one way they can convince the emotionally-unstable Lucy to let him stay with them for a little while.
| 225 | 4 | "Don't Ax, Don't Tell" | Joel J. Feigenbaum | Brenda Hampton | October 22, 2006 | 62006-11-225 | 3.27 |
Continuing to manage the household in Annie's absence, Eric begins to home-school the twins and suffers more stress when their teacher comes to the house eager to start a relationship with him. Meanwhile, Lucy and Kevin notice Eric's strange behavior and investigate, making matters worse.
| 226 | 5 | "The Replacements" | Michael McDonald | Brenda Hampton | October 29, 2006 | 62006-11-226 | 3.14 |
Eric makes yet another decision without consulting Annie, who returns home to drastic changes, including three new teenage houseguests; Sandy finds herself in a romantic triangle with Martin and a guy from school.
| 227 | 6 | "Broken Hearts and Promises" | Michael Preece | Brenda Hampton | November 5, 2006 | 62006-11-227 | 3.85 |
When the paramedics are called to the house, Annie realizes that Eric has been hiding his health issues from her; Lucy contemplates having more children after visiting Sandy, who must choose between the two guys in her life.
| 228 | 7 | "You Take the High Road…" (Part 1) | Joel J. Feigenbaum | Jeffrey Rodgers | November 12, 2006 | 62006-11-228 | 3.62 |
Ruthie is nervous when she finds out that her parents are heading to Scotland, and she reveals her unattractive side when she openly admits that she won't sacrifice her own freedom and happiness to return home to her sick father; Kevin has trouble helping Lucy get to grips with Eric's illness; Sandy accepts Martin's marriage proposal just to get rid of her clingy boyfriend; Kevin finds out a secret about Jane.
| 229 | 8 | "…And I'll Take the Low Road" (Part 2) | Joel J. Feigenbaum | Brenda Hampton | November 19, 2006 | 62006-11-229 | 4.51 |
Eric and Annie get to Scotland and inform Ruthie of her father's health prognosis, but she shocks them with her lack of sympathy; at home, Lucy steps up as a much-needed source of stability for her younger siblings and tries to help T-Bone make a big decision; Sandy calls off her marriage plans when Martin's best friend questions why they're in such a rush.
| 230 | 9 | "Thanks and Giving" | Keith Truesdell | Brenda Hampton | November 26, 2006 | 62006-11-230 | 4.22 |
On their way home from Scotland, Eric, Annie, and Ruthie are held at the airport after Ruthie makes an unusual comment; Mac seeks information about Sandy's feelings for Simon as a favor to Martin; Lucy tries her best to stay strong for the whole family as the truth about Eric's health comes out.
| 231 | 10 | "You Don't Know What You've Got 'Til He's Gone" | Harry Harris | Story by : Brenda Hampton; Teleplay by : Jeffrey Rodgers | December 3, 2006 | 62006-11-231 | 4.23 |
Eric takes a new approach to counseling parishioners; T-Bone stuns Ruthie by telling her what he thinks of her selfish, obnoxious attitude and ending with a kiss.
| 232 | 11 | "Christmas!" | Keith Truesdell | Elaine Arata & Brenda Hampton | December 10, 2006 | 62006-11-232 | 4.39 |
Eric suddenly finds himself in heaven, literally, when he runs into several people who have gone before him, particularly his mother-in-law Jenny. Meanwhile, the family worries when Eric doesn't come home from work, and Annie tries to hold everyone together.
| 233 | 12 | "Can I Just Get Something to Eat?" | Harry Harris | Teleplay by : Chris Olsen & Jeff Olsen; Story by : Brenda Hampton | January 14, 2007 | 62006-11-233 | 3.13 |
When Ruthie and T-Bone work on a school assignment about the genocide in Darfur, they involve the whole family and the community in the cause.
| 234 | 13 | "Script Number Two Hundred Thirty-Four" | Joel J. Feigenbaum | Caroline Kepnes | January 21, 2007 | 62006-11-234 | 3.33 |
When Eric and Lucy tell everyone that they are going out of town on "official church business," Annie and Kevin seek the truth about their spouses' little white lies. Meanwhile, Sandy takes over Lucy's teen class for the day, and Ruthie is determined to prove she's no little girl anymore.
| 235 | 14 | "Deacon Blues" | Michael Preece | Jeffrey Rodgers | January 28, 2007 | 62006-11-235 | 3.16 |
Ruthie insists that T-Bone get his driver's license so they can go away for privacy; unfortunately, T-Bone makes the mistake of asking Kevin to help him get ready for the test. Lou informs a stunned Eric that the church deacons feel that he and Lucy no longer appeal to the younger church members and suggest that Sandy deliver the next sermon; Mac gets a job at the movie theater so he can afford an apartment with Jane and Margaret.
| 236 | 15 | "Tit for Tat" | Lindsley Parsons III | Chris Olsen & Jeff Olsen | February 11, 2007 | 62006-11-236 | 2.90 |
Sandy starts falling for a handsome doctor, which worries Martin; on Valentine's Day T-Bone and Ruthie find an unusual way to profess their love for each other; when Lucy and Kevin swiftly depart when the Colonel and Ruth drop by unexpectedly, Eric fears that his parents know about his health issue.
| 237 | 16 | "Gimme That Ol' Time Religion" | Joel J. Feigenbaum | Chris Olsen & Jeff Olsen | February 18, 2007 | 62006-11-237 | 3.57 |
Ruthie tries to hide her tattoo from her parents, who already know something's up with her; Lucy knows about the tattoo but has a specific reason for keeping it to herself. As it turns out, most of the Camdens have things they'd rather not reveal...
| 238 | 17 | "Small Miracles" | Michael Preece | Elaine Arata | April 8, 2007 | 62006-11-238 | 2.15 |
When small things happen, some Camdens see them as signs: Lucy and Kevin both cross paths with a black bird and dread that it's a bad sign; Ruthie loses a diamond in the ring T-Bone gave her as promise to someday get engaged, she wonders if it's a sign that she shouldn't be with T-Bone.
| 239 | 18 | "Inked" | Keith Truesdell | Chad Bynes | April 15, 2007 | 62006-11-239 | 2.80 |
When Lucy gets an unexpected job offer in the small town of Crossroads, she and Kevin drive out there to check it out. Back in Glenoak, Ruthie learns that removing her tattoo will be expensive, and after getting no sympathy from her parents, she tries guilting T-Bone into paying for it.
| 240 | 19 | "Some Break-Ups and Some Get-Togethers" | Jason Priestley | Justin Trofholz | April 22, 2007 | 62006-11-240 | 2.79 |
Ruthie gets a text message from what she thinks is T-Bone breaking up with her; Lucy try to decide whether to relocate to Crossroads.
| 241 | 20 | "Nothing Says Lovin' Like Something From the Oven" | Joel J. Feigenbaum | Story by : Brenda Hampton; Teleplay by : Hrag Gaboudian | April 29, 2007 | 62006-11-241 | 2.96 |
With plans for another child, Lucy tells Kevin that moving so far from the family might not be best; T-Bone confides to Eric that he's having second thoughts about breaking up with Ruthie, who's been spending all her free time with Martin; Sandy's boyfriend proposes; T-Bone's estranged father appears at the Camdens'.
| 242 | 21 | "Good News for Almost Everyone" | Keith Truesdell | Brenda Hampton | May 6, 2007 | 62006-11-242 | 2.91 |
Eric has a dream of something being better and drives himself to the hospital when he wakes up with a hunch about his heart condition; when he keeps singing "You Are My Sunshine," the doctors ask if he's been drinking. The kids, especially Lucy, are bundles of nerves since they don't know whether the news is good or bad. Sitting in the waiting room, Ruthie and T-Bone decide to get back together, but unexpected events bring back unresolved issues with the guy who broke her heart the year before. In the chaos, David and Sam are left home alone.
| 243 | 22 | "And Away We Go" | Harry Harris | Brenda Hampton | May 13, 2007 | 62006-11-243 | 3.32 |
In the series finale Eric and Annie decide to celebrate Eric's clean bill of health in a spontaneous way. The Colonel and Ruth send them an R.V. so they can see the United States. Eric plans to quit his ministry and keep home-schooling the twins. Ruthie choose T-Bone as her boyfriend and she and Martin part on good terms; she also graduates early and informs her parents that she wants to forgo college in the fall to travel the world with T-Bone. Meanwhile, Lucy and Kevin make some final decisions about their future, and as the lives of Camden family members change dramatically, their most-recent houseguests must determine where their own lives are headed.
