= Gerard Piel =

American journalist (1915–2004)

- Born: March 1, 1915; Woodmere, New York
- Died: September 5, 2004 (aged 89); New York City
- Education: Harvard University (B.A., History, 1937)
- Occupation: publisher
- Known for: Scientific American magazine
- Relatives: David Piel (brother)
- Awards: Kalinga Prize (1962); In Praise of Reason (CSI- 1990)

Gerard Piel (1 March 1915 in Woodmere, N.Y. – 5 September 2004) was the publisher of the new Scientific American magazine starting in 1948. He wrote for magazines, including The Nation, and published books on science for the general public. In 1990, Piel was presented with the In Praise of Reason award by the Committee for Skeptical Inquiry (CSICOP).

== Education and career ==
Piel graduated from Harvard University, magna cum laude, with a Bachelor of Arts degree in 1937. He was the science editor of Life magazine from 1939 to 1945. In 1946 and 1947, he worked at the Henry Kaiser Company as assistant to the president. In 1948, in association with two colleagues, he launched a new version of Scientific American to promote science literacy for the general public in the postwar era. In January 1957 Piel hired the then unknown Martin Gardner to write the Mathematical Games column, a feature that became one of the most popular parts of the magazine, lasted for 25 years, and produced almost 300 columns.

Piel was elected to the American Academy of Arts and Sciences and the American Philosophical Society. He held a number of honorary degrees and awards, including the UNESCO Kalinga Prize in 1962.

== Global policy ==
He was one of the signatories of the agreement to convene a convention for drafting a world constitution. As a result, for the first time in human history, a World Constitutional Convention convened to draft and adopt the Constitution for the Federation of Earth.

== Bibliography ==
=== Books ===
- The Age of Science: What We Learned in the 20th Century
- Science in the Cause of Man
- The Acceleration of History Alfred A. Knopf, 1972, ISBN 0-394-47312-4
- Only One World: Our Own to Make and to Keep, 1992
- The World of Rene Dubos: A Collection of His Writings

=== Articles ===
- Piel, Gerard (February 1994). "Essay: AIDS and Population 'Control'". Scientific American. 270 (2): 92. doi:10.1038/scientificamerican0294-124. PMID 8108695.
