= The Escape Team =

2018 studio album by They Might Be Giants

Studio album by They Might Be Giants
- Released: December 10, 2018
- Studio: Reservoir Studios NYC
- Genre: Alternative rock
- Length: 23:42
- Label: Idlewild
- Producer: They Might Be Giants, Pat Dillett

They Might Be Giants chronology
My Murdered Remains (2018)	The Escape Team (2018)	Book (2021)

The Escape Team is the 22nd studio album by American alternative rock band They Might Be Giants, released on December 10, 2018 as a digital download and pre-order. The digital download and pre-order was released simultaneously with My Murdered Remains. The physical album was released in May 2019.

The Escape Team is a concept album, made in collaboration with long-time TMBG music video collaborator David Cowles, based on fictional characters from his original comic book of the same name.

== Track listing ==
All tracks are written by They Might Be Giants.

No.	Title	Length
1.	"Jackie the Clipper"	2:22
2.	"Chip the CHiP"	1:48
3.	"Burnice"	1:54
4.	"Dr. Sy Fly"	2:03
5.	"Dunkin of Course of Course"	2:06
6.	"Mr. Mischief Night"	2:11
7.	"John Postal"	2:37
8.	"Flo Wheeler"	2:05
9.	"Corrupted Lyle"	1:39
10.	"Re-PETE Offender"	2:13
11.	"The Poisonousness"	2:55
Total length:		23:53

== Personnel ==
They Might Be Giants

- John Flansburgh – vocals, guitars, programming, etc.
- John Linnell – vocals, keyboards, woodwinds, etc.
- Marty Beller – drums
- Dan Miller – guitars
- Danny Weinkauf – bass guitar

Additional musicians

- Chris Anderson – bass and mellotron on "Corrupted Lyle"
- Robin Goldwasser – vocals on "The Poisonousness"

Production

- Daniel Avila – engineering
- Pat Dillett – production, mixing
- James York – engineering
- Ue Nastasi – audio mastering
