= The Carrot Seed =

1945 book by Ruth Krauss

- First edition (paperback)
- Author: Ruth Krauss
- Illustrator: Crockett Johnson
- Language: English
- Genre: Children's picture book
- Publisher: Scholastic, Harper Collins Publishers
- Publication date: 1945
- Publication place: United States
- Media type: Print
- Pages: 15

The Carrot Seed is a 1945 children's book by Ruth Krauss. As of 2004, The Carrot Seed has been in print continuously since its first publication in 1945.

== Description ==
The Carrot Seed was illustrated by Krauss's husband, Crockett Johnson. At 101 words, it was one of the shortest picture book texts when it was published in 1945.

== Plot ==
The book opens with the words: "A little boy planted a carrot seed. His mother said, 'I'm afraid it won't come up.'" A little boy plants a carrot seed to grow a giant carrot. Despite the skepticism of his parents and, particularly, his older brother, he persists and "pulled up the weeds around it every day and sprinkled the ground with water". The book concludes simply "And then, one day...! A CARROT CAME UP! Just as the little boy had known it would!". The carrot (because it was a giant carrot) is so large that it fills a wheelbarrow. However the top is missing (possibly because the little boy broke the top off of the giant carrot when he pulled it out of the ground). The book is about not giving up no matter what anyone says, and believing in yourself.
