= Book (album) =

2021 studio album by They Might Be Giants

Studio album by They Might Be Giants
- Released: November 12, 2021
- Recorded: March 2019 – December 2020
- Studio: Reservoir Studios, Manhattan; The Governor's Bluff, Sullivan County; Collyer Brothers Studio, Brooklyn
- Genre: Alternative rock
- Length: 42:03
- Label: Idlewild
- Producer: Pat Dillett

They Might Be Giants chronology
The Escape Team (2018)	Book (2021)	The World Is to Dig (2026)

Alternative cover
- Cover of the book + CD edition

Book (stylized as BOOK) is the 23rd studio album by American alternative rock band They Might Be Giants, released on November 12, 2021. It was released as a digital download, a compact disc, a vinyl record, a cassette tape, an 8-track tape, and a hardcover book plus CD.

It was released along with a 144-page book which features lyrics from 14 of the 15 songs from the album, as well as songs from the accompanying The Pamphlet EP and other recent They Might Be Giants albums. The lyrics appear in the form of shape poems with accompanying photos.

In 2023, Book was nominated for a Grammy award for Best Boxed or Special Limited Edition Package.

== Critical reception ==
Professional ratings
Review scores
Source	Rating
Allmusic	4/5 stars
And It Don't Stop	B+
Metacritic	81/100

On AllMusic Heather Phares wrote, "Comprising an album and a 144-page collection of photos by Brian Karlsson and lyrics expressively rendered by a 1970s IBM Selectric typewriter, Book is an audiovisual celebration of the band's enduring strengths... Consistently entertaining with a few flashes of brilliance, Book kicks off the band's fifth decade of music-making with substance and style".

On PopMatters Chris Conaton said, "After 40 years and 20-plus albums that span many, many genres but are almost always filled with big hooks and endearing bizarreness, They Might Be Giants are as energetic and interesting as ever. The fact that they've always had an absurdist bent and an experimental side essentially lets them do whatever they want. [...] [Book is] a thoroughly enjoyable record from start to finish".

For Spectrum Culture John Garratt noted, "BOOK still delivers in all the ways that count, be it lyrically, melodically or performative".

In Glide Magazine Shawn Donohue wrote, "The album is accompanied by a 144-page full-color, cloth-bound hardcover which features original work by Brooklyn photographer Brian Karlsson and lyrics selected from several TMBG albums set in typographical illustrations by graphic designer Paul Sahre. [...] On Book (the record) They Might Be Giants continue to pump out what they always have, smart earworm pop tunes that are slightly odd, tastefully corny and instantly catchy".

== Track listing ==
All tracks are written by John Flansburgh, John Linnell.

No.	Title	Length
1.	"Synopsis for Latecomers"	2:25
2.	"Moonbeam Rays"	2:51
3.	"I Broke My Own Rule"	3:22
4.	"Brontosaurus"	3:04
5.	"Lord Snowdon"	2:25
6.	"If Day for Winnipeg"	2:13
7.	"I Can't Remember the Dream"	3:12
8.	"Drown the Clown"	2:41
9.	"Darling, the Dose"	2:15
10.	"I Lost Thursday"	3:14
11.	"Part of You Wants to Believe Me"	2:58
12.	"Super Cool"	2:11
13.	"Wait Actually Yeah No"	3:20
14.	"Quit the Circus"	2:52
15.	"Less Than One"	3:00
Total length:		42:03

== Personnel ==
They Might Be Giants

- John Flansburgh – vocals, guitars, programming, etc.
- John Linnell – vocals, keyboards, woodwinds, etc.
- Dan Miller – guitar
- Danny Weinkauf – bass
- Marty Beller – drums, percussion

Additional musicians

- Curt Ramm – trumpet
- Dan Levine – trombone, bass trombone
- Stan Harrison – baritone saxophone, flute

Production

- Produced by Patrick Dillett and They Might Be Giants
- Mixing: Patrick Dillett, Thom Beemer
- Engineering: James Yost, Thom Beemer, Matthew Sullivan
- Mastering: UE Nastasi
- Art direction: Paul Sahre
- Photography: Brian Karlsson

== Charts ==
Chart (2021)	Peak position
US Billboard 200	87
US Independent Albums (Billboard)	14
US Top Alternative Albums (Billboard)	7
US Top Rock Albums (Billboard)	10
