= My Murdered Remains =

2018 studio album by They Might Be Giants

Studio album by They Might Be Giants
- Released: December 10, 2018
- Studios: Reservoir Studios (New York City); Collyer Brothers (Brooklyn); The Governor's Bluff (Sullivan County)
- Genre: Alternative rock
- Length: 43:00 (standard album); 78:25 (with bonus disc)
- Label: Idlewild
- Producers: They Might Be Giants, Pat Dillett

They Might Be Giants chronology
I Like Fun (2018)	My Murdered Remains (2018)	The Escape Team (2018)

My Murdered Remains is the 21st album by American alternative rock band They Might Be Giants, released on December 10, 2018 as a digital download. The standard disc consists entirely of songs from the band's 2018 Dial-A-Song project, and a 16-track bonus disc is included, titled More Murdered Remains. The album was released simultaneously with The Escape Team.

== Track listing ==
All tracks are written by They Might Be Giants, except where noted.

No.	Title	Length
1.	"The Communists Have the Music"	2:27
2.	"I've Been Seeing Things"	3:21
3.	"Gudetama's Busy Days"	2:35
4.	"Dog"	2:05
5.	"Ampersand"	2:22
6.	"Applause Applause Applause"	2:07
7.	"The Neck Rolls Aren't Working"	2:58
8.	"Selectionist"	3:03
9.	"I Haven't Been Right Yet"	2:35
10.	"Unctuous Robot"	1:48
11.	"The Bullies"	2:03
12.	"Tractor"	2:31
13.	"Rowboat Mayor"	2:49
14.	"Tick Tick Tick"	2:35
15.	"Last Wave (alt. version)"	3:58
16.	"Best Regrets"	3:35
Total length:		42:51

More Murdered Remains (bonus disc)
No.	Title	Writer(s)	Length
1.	"This Is Only Going to Go One Way"		2:41
2.	"Prepare"		2:56
3.	"No Cops" (feat. Corn Mo)		1:22
4.	"Starry Eyes"	Will Birch, John Wicks	3:27
5.	"The Velvet Ape"		3:01
6.	"Tesla (2 4 6 8 Remix)"		2:04
7.	"Whole Lot of Glean"		2:15
8.	"I Was Dancing in the Lesbian Bar"	Jonathan Richman	2:18
9.	"Rock Club"		2:34
10.	"Thankful for Your Service"		2:12
11.	"The Summer Breeze"		2:06
12.	"Another Weirdo"		1:51
13.	"Door to Door Minotaur"		1:40
14.	"The Greatest (full-length mix)"		2:31
15.	"Christmas in the Big House"		1:54
16.	"The Power of Dial-A-Song"		1:04
Total length:			35:56

== Personnel ==
They Might Be Giants

- John Flansburgh – vocals, guitars, programming, etc.
- John Linnell – vocals, keyboards, woodwinds, etc.
- Dan Miller – guitars
- Danny Weinkauf – bass guitar
- Marty Beller – drums

Additional musicians

- Robin Goldwasser – vocals (3)
- Corn Mo – vocal (bonus disc track 3)

Technical

- They Might Be Giants – producers
- Patrick Dillett – producer, mixing
- James York – engineer
- Daniel Avila – engineer
- UE Nastasi – mastering
- Paul Sahre – design
