= 7th Heaven season 10 =

7th Heaven
- Season 10
- DVD cover
- No. of episodes: 22

Release
- Original network: The WB
- Original release: September 19, 2005 – May 8, 2006

Season chronology
- ← Previous; Season 9 Next → Season 11

The tenth season of 7th Heaven—an American family-drama television series, created and produced by Brenda Hampton—premiered on September 19, 2005 on The WB, and concluded on May 8, 2006 (22 episodes). This season was intended to be the final season, but due to the finale gaining such high ratings, The CW, which was formed after The WB and UPN were combined, gave it an eleventh season.

== Cast and characters ==
=== Main ===
- Stephen Collins as Eric Camden
- Catherine Hicks as Annie Camden
- David Gallagher as Simon Camden
- Beverley Mitchell as Lucy Camden-Kinkirk
- Mackenzie Rosman as Ruthie Camden
- Nikolas and Lorenzo Brino as Sam and David Camden
- George Stults as Kevin Kinkirk
- Tyler Hoechlin as Martin Brewer
- Sarah Thompson as Rose
- Happy the Dog as herself

=== Recurring ===
- Carlos Ponce as Carlos Rivera (3 episodes)
- Haylie Duff as Sandy Jameson (14 episodes)
- Megan Henning as Meredith Davies (9 episodes)
- Barry Watson as Matt Camden (2 episodes)
- Jessica Biel as Mary Camden-Rivera (1 episode)

== Episodes ==
| No. overall | No. in season | Title | Directed by | Written by | Original release date | Prod. code | Viewers (millions) |
|---|---|---|---|---|---|---|---|
| 200 | 1 | "It's Late" | Harry Harris | Brenda Hampton | September 19, 2005 | 62006-10-200 | 5.42 |
Sandy, a college student with whom Martin spent time over the summer, visits him with big news; Lucy speaks about parenthood in her first church sermon and her message angers most of her congregation; Ruthie seeks the attention of a boy who is already dating her friend; Eric and Annie must tell his parents about Mary and Carlos' situation.
| 201 | 2 | "Home Run" | Harry Harris | Brenda Hampton & Chris Olsen | September 26, 2005 | 62006-10-201 | 5.04 |
A young boy shoots at Kevin; the Colonel and Ruth visit and Rose wants them to know that she and Simon are engaged, but everyone else (including Simon) disagrees; Sandy feels betrayed when Martin not only won't call her back, but he's also pursuing someone else entirely.
| 202 | 3 | "Mama's Gonna Buy You a Diamond Ring" | Joel J. Feigenbaum | Brenda Hampton & Chris Olsen | October 3, 2005 | 62006-10-202 | 5.34 |
Ruthie cold-shoulders Eric when she loses the chance to date an older guy; Lucy doesn't like the repercussions of Kevin's new role in their daughter's life; Eric misinterprets a phone call from Simon.
| 203 | 4 | "Ring Around the Rosie" | Joel J. Feigenbaum | Elaine Arata & Brenda Hampton | October 10, 2005 | 62006-10-203 | 5.26 |
Simon finds a way to slow down his relationship with Rose, but her stubbornness derails his plan; Ruthie tries to ditch a boy who wants to date her; one of the girls in Lucy's support group tells her she's pregnant.
| 204 | 5 | "The Rat's Out of the Bag" | Barry Watson | Brenda Hampton & Jeffrey Rodgers | October 17, 2005 | 62006-10-204 | 5.32 |
Matt makes a surprise visit to Glenoak and accompanies Kevin to a children's party where he dresses up as a well-known children's-show character; later they decide to follow Lucy after she tells Kevin she's going to visit Simon, although she's actually visiting Sandy on a private matter involving Martin; Eric has his own suspicions about Lucy's visit to Simon, and after spying on her, he and Matt find out about Sandy's pregnancy; Meredith wonders why Martin no longer keeps his cellphone--which is his way of avoiding Sandy and her situation. Special guest star: Barry Watson
| 205 | 6 | "Helpful" | Harry Harris | Brenda Hampton, Courtney Turk & Kelley Turk | October 31, 2005 | 62006-10-205 | 5.29 |
Kevin asks Lucy to let him help her with a problem that she is handling regarding Martin and Sandy; Ruthie introduces Eric to a boy she wants to date; Eric meets with Meredith's adoptive father, who has questions about Martin.
| 206 | 7 | "Soup's On" | Joel J. Feigenbaum | Brenda Hampton & Victoria Huff | November 7, 2005 | 62006-10-206 | 5.62 |
Eric meets Sandy's father, who gives him an envelope of money intended for Sandy; Ruthie collects soup-can labels to help her school's newspaper; Simon has money troubles and his phone services get shut off; Martin has a heart-to-heart talk with Meredith about their future.
| 207 | 8 | "Chicken Noodle Heads" | Keith Truesdell | Brenda Hampton & Chris Olsen | November 14, 2005 | 62006-10-207 | 5.81 |
Sandy's parents want nothing to do with her or her baby; Eric gets a new perspective on Sandy's pregnancy when he learns that his parents were expecting him before they married.
| 208 | 9 | "Turkey" | Michael Preece | Brenda Hampton & Jeff Olsen | November 21, 2005 | 62006-10-208 | 6.26 |
Martin and Meredith break up and while Ruthie's heart soars with hope that she'll be his new girlfriend, her family is concerned that she's setting herself up for serious heartache, and everyone at school believes she's pregnant by Martin. Meanwhile, the Camdens, Sandy, and Rose spend Thanksgiving at the church serving dinner to the homeless, and Eric and Annie make a conscious effort to be nicer to their future daughter-in-law.
| 209 | 10 | "Apple Pie" | Lindsley Parsons III | Brenda Hampton & Jeffrey Rodgers | November 28, 2005 | 62006-10-209 | 5.93 |
Simon suspects Rose is keeping secrets, and the two resolve a trust issue; Kevin's beef with Martin's attitude about being a father becomes apparent; Eric and Annie finally let Ruthie date Jack.
| 210 | 11 | "X-Mas" | Harry Harris | Brenda Hampton & Jeffrey Rodgers | December 12, 2005 | 62006-10-210 | 6.48 |
The Camdens get into the Christmas spirit: Eric volunteers at a retirement home; Ruthie volunteers at the hospital and reunites with a friend; Lucy is back to working with Habitat For Humanity; Annie takes the twins to a local Catholic church to talk with some Sudanese students; with baby Savannah at his side, Kevin dresses as Santa and hands out presents at the pool hall, then faces a dilemma about returning a lost dog to the kennel.
| 211 | 12 | "Got MLK?" | Joel J. Feigenbaum | Orlando Bishop, Kevin Brownridge & Damani Mangum | January 23, 2006 | 62006-10-211 | 5.21 |
New African-American student Alex wants to give a report on Dr. Martin Luther King Jr., but his teacher says they've already discussed him in class; when Martin inadvertently supports Alex's case, his car is defaced with racial slurs and he refuses to wash it off until the culprit is caught. Meanwhile, for her own report, Ruthie attempts to recycle an essay that she wrote three years ago.
| 212 | 13 | "And Baby Makes Three" | Michael Preece | Lawrence H. Levy | January 30, 2006 | 62006-10-212 | 6.28 |
As Sandy prepares to give birth, almost everyone rallies around her at the hospital and hopes that Martin will accept what might be his very last chance to accept responsibility for his child--but he has an important baseball tryout with a talent scout. Meanwhile, Kevin and Lucy differ over having more children; and Simon and Rose might be over, much to the Camdens' delight.
| 213 | 14 | "The Magic of Gershwin" | Harry Harris | Paul Perlove | February 6, 2006 | 62006-10-213 | 5.89 |
Ruthie meets a troubled girl in detention, where a music teacher is assigned to watch the students, and the girls bond over the lessons about Gershwin while Ruthie nurses her broken heart. She offers to help her new friend, who refuses charity, but the Camdens refuse her refusal.
| 214 | 15 | "Love and Obsession" | Ron High | Lawrence H. Levy | February 13, 2006 | 62006-10-214 | 5.89 |
As Valentine's Day approaches, Kevin plans a special dinner, while Ruthie can't let go of her feelings for Martin; Annie has trouble accepting Rose--and the twins' request for the store-bought birthday cake instead of her home-baked one.
| 215 | 16 | "Moving Ahead" | Joel J. Feigenbaum | Paul Perlove | February 27, 2006 | 62006-10-215 | 5.71 |
Annie and Ruthie spend the day together to unwind; professional and personal news complicate Lucy's world; Eric unintentionally shakes things up between Simon and Rose.
| 216 | 17 | "Highway to Cell" | Michael Preece | Chad Byrnes | April 3, 2006 | 62006-10-216 | 4.61 |
Ruthie is upset that she hasn't gotten any calls on her new cellphone, so Eric gives out her number; Simon and Rose have dinner with her former fiancé, who is nothing like Simon expected.
| 217 | 18 | "Invitation to Disaster" | Keith Truesdell | Justin Trofholz | April 10, 2006 | 62006-10-217 | 4.99 |
When the Camdens receive official invitations to Simon and Rose's wedding, they're dismayed to learn that the date conflicts with Matt and Sarah's graduation from medical school, then more dismayed that Rose stubbornly refuses to change the wedding date. Eric and Kevin think they have a solution, but Annie disapproves of their methods and seeks help from an entirely-different source. Meanwhile, Ruthie wants to enroll in a summer program that takes place in Scotland.
| 218 | 19 | "Secrets" | Harry Harris | Brenda Hampton & Jeffrey Rodgers | April 17, 2006 | 62006-10-218 | 4.85 |
The twins use an interesting weapon to coax the entire family into sharing personal secrets. As everyone figures out what's going on, there are hurt feelings and confusion and the possibility that Ruthie has the biggest surprise of all. Meanwhile, the family doesn't understand Annie's new fondness for Rose, which especially irritates Lucy and Ruthie.
| 219 | 20 | "And More Secrets" | Joel J. Feigenbaum | Brenda Hampton, Chris Olsen & Jeff Olsen | April 24, 2006 | 62006-10-219 | 5.28 |
The men try to hide secrets from their women (Kevin and Eric's wedding-ring woes; Simon's schoolwork problem) but discover that they've underestimated them.
| 220 | 21 | "Goodbye…" (Part 1) | Michael Preece | Brenda Hampton | May 1, 2006 | 62006-10-220 | 5.66 |
As Rose readies to make a huge announcement, Simon breaks down as he realizes that he might have trapped himself in an unwanted marriage; Eric and Annie reminisce about their children's younger days as they meet Rose's unconventional parents and prepare for the rehearsal dinner.
| 221 | 22 | "…And Thank You" (Part 2) | Michael Preece | Brenda Hampton | May 8, 2006 | 62006-10-221 | 7.56 |
Simon and Rose prepare for their wedding day, despite speculation that it is not the right decision; Annie and Eric imagine various scenarios as they reflect on how the wedding will play out; Rose's former boyfriend unexpectedly appears; Ruthie considers studying in Scotland for the summer; Kevin and Lucy, and Matt and Sarah, all have life-changing news...if only they can find the perfect time to announce it. Note: This is the final episode for: Barry Watson, Jessica Biel, and David Gallagher
