= Franz Bornschein =

American composer, teacher and music critic (1879–1948)

Franz Carl Bornschein (February 10, 1879 – June 8, 1948) was an American composer, teacher, and music critic based in Baltimore.

Born in Baltimore, Maryland, he studied at the Peabody Conservatory of Music. He later became a professor there. He also served for a time as the music critic of the Baltimore Evening Sun. He also taught violin at Baltimore's Western High School. Among his students was Ruth Krauss.

His wife, Hazel Knox, was a singer who taught at Peabody.

Much of Bornschein's output is orchestral, including a number of suites as well as a violin concerto; he also wrote a good deal of chamber music, some songs, and some works for choir which won a handful of prizes. In larger forms, he wrote cantatas, oratorios, and operettas. Some of his music was published under the pseudonym Frank Fairfield.

Bornschein died in 1948; his papers are held at the library of the Maryland Historical Society in Baltimore.

== Selected compositions ==
- Joy, choral setting of Walt Whitman's The Mystic Trumpeter, joint winner of the National Federation of Music Clubs' 1943 choral composition contest.
- Emperor and the Nightingale, cantata
- Independence Bell, cantata
- King Nutcracker, a fantasy for chorus of women's voices and ballet, based on Tchaikovsky's The Nutcracker Suite.
- Seasons, a choral adaptation of Schubert
- Tuscan Cypress, a cantata
- The French Clock
- Six French Folk Songs, in an arrangement for youth string orchestra and three-part treble voices.
