= Crockett Johnson =

American cartoonist and children's book illustrator (1906–1975)

- Born: David Johnson Leisk; October 20, 1906 New York, New York State, USA
- Died: July 11, 1975 (aged 68) Norwalk, Connecticut, USA
- Area: Cartoonist
- Notable works: Barnaby, Harold and the Purple Crayon

David Johnson Leisk (October 20, 1906 – July 11, 1975), professionally known by his pen name Crockett Johnson, was an American cartoonist and children's book illustrator. He is best known for the comic strip Barnaby (1942–1952) and the Harold series of books, beginning with Harold and the Purple Crayon.

From 1965 until his death, Johnson created more than a hundred paintings relating to mathematics and mathematical physics. Eighty of these are found in the collections of the National Museum of American History.

== Biography ==
Born in New York City, Johnson grew up in Corona, Queens, New York, attended PS 16 and Newtown High School. His father was from the Shetland Islands in Scotland and his mother was an immigrant from Germany. He studied art at Cooper Union in 1924, and at New York University in 1925. He explained his choice of pseudonym as follows: "Crockett is my childhood nickname. My real name is David Johnson Leisk. Leisk was too hard to pronounce—so—I am now Crockett Johnson!"

By the late 1920s, Johnson was art editor at several McGraw-Hill trade publications. With the Great Depression, Johnson became politicized and turned leftward, joining the radical Book and Magazine Writers Union. In 1934, he began his cartooning career by contributing to the Communist Party publication New Masses and subsequently joined the publication's staff, becoming its art editor and redesigning the magazine's layout. He remained with the magazine until 1940 and embarked on a career drawing comic strips in a series in Collier's magazine named "The Little Man with the Eyes". In 1942, he developed the Barnaby strip which would make him famous for the left-wing daily newspaper PM.

On June 25, 1943 Johnson married writer Ruth Krauss. They had no children together, nor did they have children with their first spouses. They lived in Westport, Connecticut. Together they collaborated on several children's books.

The children's book Harold and the Purple Crayon was published in 1955.

He died on July 11, 1975, at Norwalk Hospital in Norwalk, Connecticut of lung cancer.

== Children's books ==
Johnson collaborated on four children's books with his wife, Ruth Krauss. The books were: The Carrot Seed, How to Make an Earthquake, Is This You?, and The Happy Egg.

Based on the book Harold and the Purple Crayon, Harold's Fairy Tale and A Picture for Harold's Room were adapted for animation by Gene Deitch.

== Mathematical paintings ==
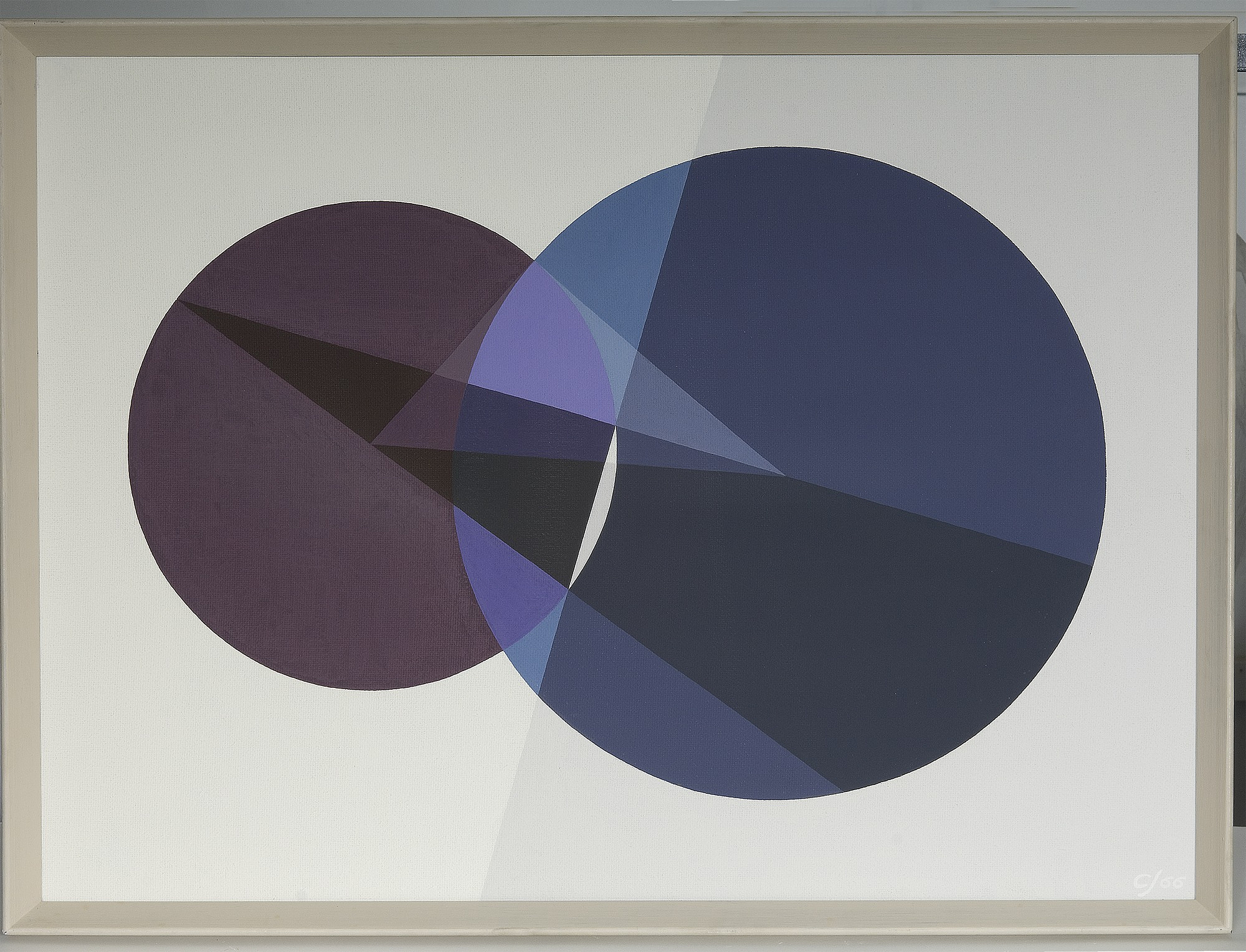
"Polar Line of a Point and a Circle (Apollonius)"

Johnson created his series of more than 100 mathematical paintings inspired by geometric principles and mathematicians. He painted layered geometric shapes in the paintings, based on classic mathematical theorems and diagrams in James R. Newman's The World of Mathematics as well as other mathematics books. The paintings were inspired by famous mathematicians such as Galileo, Euclid, Descartes, and many more, and the titles of said paintings are references to each mathematician--"Proof of the Pythagorean Theorem" for Euclid, "Pendulum Momentum" for Galileo, and "Square Root of Two" after Descartes. Later, he began to construct using his own inventions. Most of Johnson's abstract images are painted with house paint on the rough side of a two-by-three foot piece of masonite, save those he enlarged to four-by-four, he explained in a letter.

Johnson made an effort to differentiate his paintings from contemporary art in that his are based on the mathematics of geometry, not solely the shapes. In his 1971 article titled "Geometric Geometric Painting", published in Leonardo, Johnson describes this type of geometric painting as using shapes and lines to experiment with color and optic illusion for decoration, the evocation of emotion, representation of ancient symbols or other purposes unrelated to geometry.

From 1965 until his death in 1975 Crockett Johnson painted more than 100 works relating to mathematics and mathematical physics.

== Works ==
- Barnaby (1943)
- Barnaby and Mr. O'Malley (1944)
- Willie's Adventures, Three Stories by Margaret Wise Brown, (1944), illus. by Johnson
- Ruth Krauss, The Carrot Seed (1945), illus. by Johnson
- Harold and the Purple Crayon (1955)
- Is This You? (1955), co-written with Ruth Krauss
- Franklyn M. Branley, Eleanor K. Vaughn, Mickey's Magnet (1956), illus. by Johnson
- Barkis: Some precise and some speculative interpretations of the meaning of a dog's bark at certain times and in certain (illustrated) circumstances (1956)
- Harold's Fairy Tale (Further Adventures with the Purple Crayon) (1956)
- Harold's Trip to the Sky (1957)
- Terrible, Terrifying Toby (1957)
- Time for Spring (1957)
- Bernadine Cook, The Little Fish That Got Away (1957)
- Harold at the North Pole (1958)
- The Blue Ribbon Puppies (1958)
- Ellen's Lion: Twelve Stories (1959)
- The Frowning Prince (1959)
- Harold's Circus (1959)
- Will Spring Be Early? or Will Spring Be Late? (1959)
- A Picture for Harold's Room (1960)
- Harold's ABC (1963)
- The Lion's Own Story: Eight New Stories about Ellen's Lion (1963)
- We Wonder What Will Walter Be? When He Grows Up (1964)
- Castles in the Sand (1965), illus. by Betty Fraser
- The Emperor's Gifts (1965)
- Barnaby #1: Wanted, A Fairy Godfather (1985)
- Barnaby #2: Mr. O'Malley and the Haunted House (1985)
- Barnaby #3: Jackeen J. O'Malley for Congress (1986)
- Barnaby #4: Mr. O'Malley Goes for the Gold (1986)
- Barnaby #5: Mr. O'Malley, Wizard of Wall Street (1986)
- Barnaby #6: J.J. O'Malley Goes Hollywood (1986)
- Magic Beach (2005), with an appreciation by Maurice Sendak and an afterword by Philip Nel
- Barnaby, Volume One: 1942-1943 (2013), with a Foreword by Chris Ware and essays by Jeet Heer, Dorothy Parker, and Philip Nel
- Barnaby, Volume Two: 1944-1945 (2014), with a Foreword by Jules Feiffer and essays by R.C. Harvey, Max Lerner, and Philip Nel
- Barnaby, Volume Three: 1946-1947 (2016), with a Foreword by Jeff Smith (cartoonist) and essays by Nathalie op de Beeck, Coulton Waugh, and Philip Nel
- Barnaby, Volume Four: 1948-1949 (2020), with a Foreword by Trina Robbins and essays by Jared Gardner, Stephen Becker, and Philip Nel
- Barnaby, Volume Five: 1950-1952 (2025), with a Foreword by Ron Howard and essays by Susan Kirtley, Crockett Johnson, and Philip Nel

The Barnaby #1 to #6 books, published in paperback by Ballantine Books under the Del Rey imprint in 1985, were compilations of the first few years of the comic strip. Additional books were supposed to appear, but publication was suspended upon the death of editor Judy-Lynn del Rey. In 2013, Fantagraphics began republishing Barnaby. The five-volume hardcover collection, featuring all ten years of Barnaby, was completed on 11 March 2025.

A 1946 play, "Barnaby and Mr. O'Malley", was based on the comic strip. Despite initial funding of $85,000 (approximately $1.28M in 2023), it ran for four performances before it "closed for repairs", never to return.
