= Ruth Krauss =

American poet, children's writer (1901–1993)

- Born: July 25, 1901; Baltimore Maryland, U.S.
- Died: July 10, 1993 (aged 91)
- Education: Parsons School of Design
- Occupation: Writer
- Spouse: Crockett Johnson
- Writing career
- Genre: Children's book

Ruth Ida Krauss (July 25, 1901 – July 10, 1993) was an American writer of children's books, including The Carrot Seed, and of theatrical poems for adult readers. Many of her books are still in print.

== Early life and education ==
Ruth Krauss was born July 25, 1901, in Baltimore, Maryland to Julius Leopold and Blanche Krauss, members of "an upper-crust Jewish family." As a child, Ruth had numerous health problems, including the rare autoimmune disorder pemphigus. She began writing and illustrating her own stories while still a child, hand sewing her pages into books.

Ruth went to Western High School, and began studying violin there with Franz Bornschein. She left in 1917 after her sophomore year to focus on the study of art. She enrolled in the Maryland Institute for the Promotion of the Mechanic Arts (now known as the Maryland Institute College of Art). The school's focus on applied arts did not suit her and she left after about a year. Her next stop was a girls camp, Camp Walden in Maine, where she discovered her love for writing; the camp yearbook for 1919 contains her first published piece of writing. After the camp, she studied violin in Peabody Institute of Music's preparatory program. She studied the first two years with her former teacher Bornschein, and a third year under Frank Gittelson. Both considered her a naturally gifted but undisciplined musician.

Ruth's father died in November 1921, requiring Ruth to drop out of school and give up the violin professionally. She took a series of office jobs and lived with her mother and at times with her aunt's family. In 1927, an inheritance from her grandmother allowed her to leave home and follow artistic pursuits. She enrolled at the Parsons School of Design in New York, focusing mostly on costume design. Classmates during this time included Claire McCardell, and she had a brief relationship with Isamu Noguchi. Graduating from Parsons in 1929, as the Great Depression was beginning, she found it difficult to get work as an illustrator. Among the work she did find in this period was the first pictorial book jacket for the Modern Library (Alice in Wonderland, 1932). She was supported during this period by her mother, who continued to run the family furrier business until her remarriage in 1930 to Albert A. Brager, founder of the Brager-Eisenberg department store.

Ruth was a member of the Writers' Laboratory at the Bank Street College of Education in New York during the 1940s.

== Personal life and career ==
In 1930, she met and married journalist and crime novelist Lionel White; they divorced shortly before World War II. After her divorce from White, Krauss married the cartoonist and children's book author Crockett Johnson in 1943. They collaborated on many books, among them The Carrot Seed, How to Make an Earthquake, Is This You? and The Happy Egg.

Another eight of her books were illustrated by Maurice Sendak, starting with A Hole Is to Dig (1952), which launched Sendak's career. The Krauss-Sendak collaborations spawned a host of imitators of their "unruly" and "rebellious" child protagonists. The peculiar definitional phrasing of Krauss's writing in this book—with sentences like "A party is to make little children happy"—was based on quotes from children in Rowayton School Kindergarten (in Rowayton, Connecticut, where Krauss and Johnson lived) and became something of a cultural phenomenon when the book was first published and has helped to maintain its popularity.

Krauss also illustrated a few of her own books. In addition to her books for children, Krauss wrote three collections of poetry and plays in verse for adults.

== Recognition ==
Two books that Krauss wrote were runners-up for the prestigious Caldecott Medal, which is awarded to children's book illustrators: The Happy Day (1950) and A Very Special House (1954).

Maurice Sendak characterized Krauss as a giant in the world of children's literature, saying: "Ruth broke rules and invented new ones, and her respect for the natural ferocity of children bloomed in to poetry that was utterly faithful to what was true in their lives". He honored her in the New Yorker cover illustration for September 27, 1993, which shows a homeless boy using Krauss's book A Hole Is to Dig as a pillow and another child holding I Can Fly as they sleep.

== Books ==
=== Children's books ===
	Title	Year	Illustrator	Notes
1.	A Good Man and His Good Wife	1944	Ad Reinhardt; re-illustrated Marc Simont (1962)	
2.	The Carrot Seed	1945	Crockett Johnson	
3.	The Great Duffy	1946	Mischa Richter	
4.	The Growing Story	1947	Phyllis Rowand	
5.	Bears	1948	Phyllis Rowand; re-illustrated Maurice Sendak (2005)	
6.	The Happy Day	1949	Marc Simont	A Caldecott Medal Honor Book for Simont
7.	The Big World and the Little House	1949	Marc Simont	
8.	The Backward Day	1950	Marc Simont	
9.	I Can Fly	1950	Mary Blair	
10.	The Bundle Book	1951	Helen Stone	
11.	A Hole Is to Dig: A First Book of First Definitions	1952	Maurice Sendak	
12.	A Very Special House	1953	Maurice Sendak	A Caldecott Medal Honor Book for Sendak
13.	I'll Be You and You Be Me	1954	Maurice Sendak	
14.	How To Make An Earthquake	1954	Crockett Johnson	
15.	Charlotte and the White Horse	1955	Maurice Sendak	
16.	Is This You?	1955		By Ruth Krauss and Crockett Johnson
17.	I Want to Paint My Bathroom Blue	1956	Maurice Sendak	
18.	Monkey Day	1957	Phyllis Rowand	
19.	The Birthday Party	1957	Maurice Sendak	
20.	Somebody Else's Nut Tree, and Other Tales from Children	1958	Maurice Sendak	
21.	A Moon or a Button: A Collection of First Picture Ideas	1959	Remy Charlip	
22.	Open House for Butterflies	1960	Maurice Sendak	
23.	Mama, I Wish I Was Snow; Child You'd Be Very Cold	1962	Ellen Raskin	
24.	A Bouquet of Littles	1963	Jane Flora	
25.	Eyes, Nose, Fingers, Toes	1964	Elizabeth Schneider	
26.	What a Fine Day for ...	1967	Remy Charlip	Music by Al Carmines
27.	The Happy Egg	1967	Crockett Johnson	
28.	This Thumbprint: Words and Thumbprints	1967		
29.	The Little King, the Little Queen, the Little Monster and Other Stories You Can Make Up Yourself	1968		
30.	If Only	1969		
31.	I Write It	1970	Mary Chalmers	
32.	Under Twenty	1970		
33.	Everything Under a Mushroom	1973	Margot Tomes	
34.	Love and the Invention of Punctuation	1973		
35.	Little Boat Lighter Than a Cork	1976	Esther Gilman	
36.	Under Thirteen	1976		
37.	When I Walk I Change the Earth	1978		
38.	Somebody Spilled the Sky	1979	Eleanor Hazard	
39.	Minestrone	1981		
40.	Re-examination of Freedom	1981		
41.	Love Poems for Children	1986		
42.	Big and Little	1987	Mary Szilagyi	
43.	And I Love You	1987	Steven Kellogg	
44.	Roar Like a Dandelion	2020	Sergio Ruzzier	

=== Poetry and verse plays ===
Title	Year	Illustrator
The Cantilever Rainbow	1965	Antonio Frasconi
There's A Little Ambiguity Among the Bluebells and Other Theater Poems	1968	
This Breast Gothic	1973	
