= Jordan Matthews (attorney) =

American lawyer (born 1984)

Jordan Matthews (born 1984) is an American business and entertainment lawyer known for handling several cases against Wynn Las Vegas and Steve Wynn. He is a partner at Holtz Matthews LLP.

Matthews is known for his aggressive and relentless litigation style, earning a reputation as a "dogged litigator" and was named by Forbes as a Best-In-State lawyer in California in 2025. He was named by the LA Times in 2024 and 2025 as an entertainment business visionary. Matthews was named as a leader of influence by the Los Angeles Business Journal in 2025. He has represented high-profile individuals and companies in the entertainment industry, including actors, producers, directors, influencers, and maintains a practice focused on high-profile, bet-the-company litigation.

== Legal career ==
=== Steve Wynn lawsuits ===
In 2018, Matthews filed suit against Wynn Las Vegas and Steve Wynn on behalf of Angelica Limcaco, a former salon manager at Wynn Las Vegas. Limcaco claimed that she was fired, blacklisted and intimidated into silence after she elevated her concerns about sexual assault in 2006 to then-president of Wynn Las Vegas, Andrew Pascal. The federal case followed a report by the Wall Street Journal in January 2018, that uncovered allegations of sexual misconduct against Steve Wynn, all of which Wynn denied regarding them as "slander". The allegations revealed that Wynn entered into a confidential $7.5 million settlement with a manicurist in 2005, who reported that she had been raped and impregnated by him.

Limcaco's case was appealed to the 9th U.S. Circuit Court of Appeals after Judge Miranda Du ruled in favor of Wynn Las Vegas holding that the claim was not made within the statute of limitations. Matthews argued that the doctrine of equitable estoppel was applicable in the case as Limcaco feared for her personal safety. Matthews filed a petition with the Ninth Circuit in March 2020 questioning the Nevada District Court's selection of Elayna Youchah, an attorney for Wynn Resorts, as a magistrate judge.

In 2020, Limaco filed a civil RICO claim against Steve Wynn, Matthew Maddox, Barbara Buckley among others in California pertaining to Wynn's casino licenses with Encore Boston Harbor and a probe by the Massachusetts Gaming Commission. The case was appealed to the Ninth Circuit of the United States Court of Appeals.In April 2020, the Ninth Circuit denied a motion by Wynn attempting to dismiss the appeal.

In May 2022, the United States Department of Justice filed a civil lawsuit against Steve Wynn for allegedly violating the Foreign Agents Registration Act. Wynn was accused of attempting to improperly influence Donald Trump to extradite Chinese dissident Guo Wengui. Wynn was accused of taking these steps on behalf of the Chinese government to protect his business interests in China. Matthews' RICO case coincided with the case filed by the Department of Justice with Matthews arguing that Wynn engaged in a "pattern of improper influence to protect business interests in the gaming industry." The case filed by the Department of Justice was later dismissed on a technicality with the judge ruling that Steve Wynn had no present obligation to register under FARA. A federal appeals court affirmed the decision.

In July 2022, Sun Lijun, China's ex-public security minister (who was the alleged point-of-contact for Steve Wynn in the alleged effort to influence the Trump Administration) pled guilty to accepting about $96.3 million in bribes related to selling government positions.

In December 2022, Matthews argued before a panel of judges, including Ryan D. Nelson in the United States Court of Appeals for the Ninth Circuit, clashing with Wynn Resorts' attorneys over claims of improper influence.

In April 2023, Matthews sought review by the Supreme Court of the United States.

In July 2023, Steve Wynn agreed to pay a $10 million fine to the Nevada Gaming Control Board and left the Nevada gaming industry in connection with claims arising out of Limcaco's complaint.

Matthews' five-year litigation with Steve Wynn, primarily over the issue of the statute of limitations, coincided with landmark changes in legislation, including the passage of the New York Adult Survivors Act, and Assembly Bills 218 and 2777 in the state of California, which extended the statute of limitations on sexual assault cases. The legislation was used to pursue numerous high-profile cases that were otherwise barred by the statute of limitations, including cases against Sean Combs, Mike Tyson, Jamie Foxx, Jimmy Iovine and others.

=== Priscilla Presley lawsuit ===
On August 11, 2025, Matthews filed suit on behalf of Priscilla Presley's former business partners, claiming $50 million in damages, and alleging that Priscilla Presley "pulled the plug" on her daughter, Lisa Marie Presley, to "regain control" of Elvis' family trust, and claiming that Lisa was preparing to sue Priscilla at the time of her death. Presley's lawyer, Marty Singer, slammed the lawsuit, claiming that it was "malicious character assassination", and released a statement, saying that he was "confident" the lawsuit would be dismissed. Matthews released a statement, saying, the "evidence will establish that the real victims are my clients, who invested millions and years of hard work into revitalizing Priscilla Presley's brand, only to be betrayed and falsely accused once the money was on the table and every personal and business issue had been resolved." An amended complaint was filed in September 2025, which included a letter from Presley's grand daughter, Riley Keough. The letter said that Keough had attempted to stop her mother, Lisa Marie Presley, from suing Priscilla just before Lisa Marie's death in January 2023. Keough and Presley released a joint statement, addressing the letter just before the release of Presley's book, "Softly As I Leave You: Life After Elvis.".

=== Lawrence Welk lawsuit ===
In January 2026, Matthews filed a lawsuit on behalf of Lawrence Welk, Jr., son of the famed bandleader Lawrence Welk, claiming that he was "improperly and illegally" removed from the family business by his nephew and estranged son.

=== Bell-Carter lawsuit ===
In March 2020, Matthews filed an anti-trust lawsuit against Bell-Carter Foods and DCOOP Group of Spain, the world's largest cooperative of olive growers, related to the Trump administration's trade tariffs against Spanish imports.

=== Deja Riley lawsuit ===
In April 2021, Matthews filed suit against Teddy Riley's daughter, Deja Riley, a fitness celebrity. The case involves celebrity influencer, YesJulz, who ran various social media campaigns for Kanye West, until she split with West around March 2024.

=== Nichelle Nichols lawsuit ===
Matthews is listed in court records as Kyle Johnson's attorney in a long-running dispute with Nichelle Nichols' former manager, Gilbert Bell. Nichols was an American actress, singer and dancer whose portrayal of Uhura in Star Trek and its film sequels was groundbreaking for African American actresses on American television. Johnson is Nichols' son and is listed in court documents as the conservator of her estate.

Johnson filed for conservatorship in 2018. Before a court granted his petition in January 2019, Nichols' friend Angelique Fawcette, who had expressed concern in 2017 over Bell's control of access to her, pressed for visitation rights. A 2019 court case by Bell over being evicted from the guesthouse on Nichols' property includes allegations that Bell misused Nichols' assets.

Bell filed for bankruptcy in October 2023.

=== Awards ===
In 2023, Matthews was named by the Los Angeles Times as a legal visionary. In 2024, Matthews was named by the Los Angeles Times as an entertainment business visionary.

== Film ==
Matthews was previously an actor and starred in the movie Fading of the Cries with Brad Dourif and Thomas Ian Nicholas. The movie also starred Mackenzie Rosman from 7th Heaven. The film was released by Lionsgate and was panned by critics.

In 2009, The Hollywood Reporter announced that he was set to star opposite Elaine Hendrix in Brian A. Metcalf's movie "Eve".

In 2012, Matthews was linked to a film fund backing a mini-series from Walter Isaacson's book "Benjamin Franklin: An American Life." Alec Baldwin was set to star and the series never got made, but was revealed in soap star Katherine Kelly Lang's divorce.

Matthews' companies were linked to film financing deals with several movie studios, including Ryan Kavanaugh's Relativity Media.

== Author ==
Matthews is the author of the book "Failure: When You Have Nothing You Have Everything."
