= Matthew Thompson (actor) =

American actor

Matthew Thompson is an actor most known for his role as Lodell in the film Tru Loved directed by Stewart Wade.

== Filmography ==
- 2007: Gangsta Rap: The Glockumentary as Francie
- 2007: The Jinn as Lucas
- 2008: Tru Loved as Lodell
- 2010: Mad World as John Bunch
- 2011: 3 Times a Charm (post-production)
- 2013: Dallas Buyers Club

Others

- 2008: Passport to Explore (TV series) as Matt, in three episodes (Portland, Seattle, Vancouver)
- 2009: ERA (Equal Rights for All) as Kevin (video short)
