= East New York (TV series) =

American police procedural television series

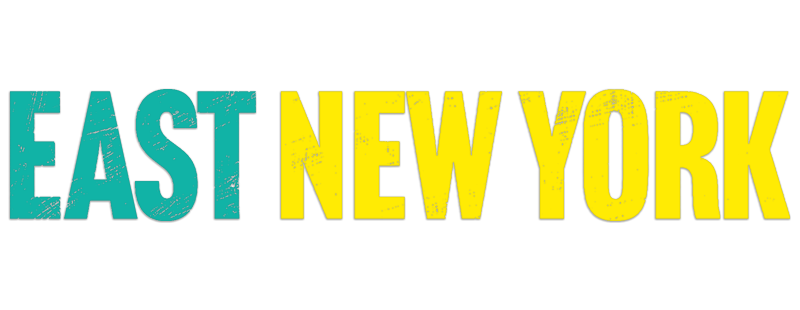
- Genre: Police procedural; Crime drama
- Created by: William Finkelstein; Mike Flynn
- Directed by: Michael M. Robin; Mo McRae; Lou Diamond Phillips
- Starring: Amanda Warren; Kevin Rankin; Richard Kind; Elizabeth Rodriguez; Olivia Luccardi; Lavel Schley; Ruben Santiago-Hudson; Jimmy Smits
- Composer: Pierre Charles
- Country of origin: United States
- Original language: English
- No. of seasons: 1
- No. of episodes: 21

Production
- Executive producers: Andrew Maher; Christine Holder; Mark Holder; Michael M. Robin; Mike Flynn; William Finkelstein; Thom Sherman; Ed Redlich
- Producers: Bryan J. Raber; Lou Fusaro; Amanda Warren
- Cinematography: Jendra Jarnagin; Zeus Morand
- Editors: Leah Breuer; Elliott Eisman; Stephanie Neroes
- Running time: 44 minutes
- Production companies: Clothesline Productions; Grounded Mind; Skyemac Productions; Wonder Street Entertainment; Play Well Entertainment; Warner Bros. Television

Original release
- Network: CBS
- Release: October 2, 2022 – May 14, 2023

East New York is an American police procedural television series that aired from October 2, 2022, until May 14, 2023, on CBS. The series starred Amanda Warren, Jimmy Smits, Ruben Santiago-Hudson, Kevin Rankin, Richard Kind, and Elizabeth Rodriguez. In May 2023, the series was canceled after one season.

== Premise ==
The series centers on the officers and detectives of the NYPD's 74th precinct in the Brooklyn neighborhood of East New York. Heading up the precinct is Deputy Inspector Regina Haywood, the newly promoted commanding officer. Haywood has a vision that not only will they serve and protect the community but become a part of it.

== Cast and characters ==
=== Main ===
- Amanda Warren as Deputy Inspector Regina Haywood
- Kevin Rankin as Detective First Grade Tommy Killian
- Richard Kind as Captain Stan Yenko
- Elizabeth Rodriguez as Detective Second Grade Crystal Morales
- Olivia Luccardi as Officer Brandy Quinlan
- Lavel Schley as Officer Andre Bentley
- Ruben Santiago-Hudson as Officer Marvin Sandeford
- Jimmy Smits as Assistant Chief John Suarez

=== Recurring ===
- C. S. Lee as Desk Sergeant Jimmy Kee
- Ben Michael Brown as Officer Matthew Lyle
- Darien Sills-Evans as New York City Deputy Mayor Raymond Sharpe
- Caitlin Mehner as Corrine Moynahan
- Michael Potts as Goody Gaines
- Scott Cohen as Adam Lustig
- Stephen Plunkett as Detective First Grade Desmond Troy
- Danielle Lee Greaves as Thora Whitefield
- Lauren Vélez as Tamika Martin
- Elizabeth Singh as Officer Leila Aziz
- Donovan Christie Jr. as DEA Special Agent Sean Dryden
- Kelly Hu as Allison Cha
- Adrian Pasdar as Bobby Azeroff

=== Guest ===
- Max Gordon Moore as ADA Seth Tolchin
- Malik Yoba as Lamonte Jacobs
- Lee Tergesen as US Marshall David Westlake
- Paul Calderón as Father Frank Suarez
- Ron Canada as Maurice Haywood
- Gemma McIlhenny as Officer Carrie Hawkins
- Nelson Avidon as Don Jankowicz
- Phil John as Stuffy
- Michael Tucker as Sy Somers
- Corbin Bernsen as Duke Jacobs
- Debi Mazar as Ann-Marie Quinlan
- Anna Maria Cianciulli as Juliana Chiari
- Manni L. Perez as Lucia Santiago
- Dario Vazquez as Napoleon Santiago
- Andrew Pincay as Sebastian Morales

== Episodes ==
No.	Title	Directed by	Written by	Original release date	Prod. code	U.S. viewers (millions)
1	"Pilot"	Michael M. Robin	William Finkelstein & Mike Flynn	October 2, 2022	T86.10002	5.27
Regina Haywood, newly promoted Deputy Inspector of the 74th precinct, is starting her first day when a man shoots a "dollar van" driver and kills two others. Detectives Tommy Killian and Crystal Morales catch the case. Haywood, launching community policing, asks for volunteers to live in a housing project; Patrol Officer Brandy Quinlan takes a 6th floor unit. Training Officer Marvin Sandeford, worried for her safety, provides support. Killian and Morales identify a suspect in the shootings.
2	"Misdemeanor Homicide"	Michael M. Robin	William Finkelstein	October 9, 2022	T86.10102	5.65
While on patrol, Sandeford and Bentley stumble upon a dead body, later identified as a hedge fund guy. Killian and Morales must work with two arrogant Detectives from Manhattan South on the high profile case. Haywood tries to help a grieving father get justice after his teenage son is killed in the housing projects, while also trying to get more resources for the case.
3	"The Small Things"	Mo McRae	Mike Flynn	October 16, 2022	T86.10103	5.44
Killian and Morales investigate a fatal shooting that left an elderly man dead. During the investigation, they discover that the intended target was a businessman name Demote Green. Haywood tries to help a teenage boy find a new path and Killian finds himself at odds with his girlfriend, Corinne, after she hires a guy he arrested in the past to work at their new bar.
4	"Snapped"	Scott Ellis	Judith McCreary	October 23, 2022	T86.10104	5.29
5	"Going Commando"	Jackeline Tejada	Allison Intrieri	October 30, 2022	T86.10105	5.84
6	"Court on the Street"	Mo McRae	Patrick Coker & Adam Wiesen	November 6, 2022	T86.10106	4.93
7	"Best Served Cold"	Michael M. Robin	Jamie Lynn Harris	November 13, 2022	T86.10107	4.70
8	"CompStat Interruptus"	Mo McRae	William Finkelstein	November 20, 2022	T86.10108	4.97
9	"When Dinosaurs Roamed The Earth"	Michael M. Robin	Mike Flynn	November 27, 2022	T86.10109	4.99
10	"10-13"	Ramaa Mosley	Allison Intrieri & Judith McCreary	January 8, 2023	T86.10110	5.68
11	"By the Book"	Randy Zisk	Jacquelyn Reingold & Jonathan Tolins	January 15, 2023	T86.10111	5.27
12	"Up in Smoke"	Nijla Mu'min	Patrick Coker & Adam Wiesen	February 19, 2023	T86.10112	4.24
13	"We Didn't Start the Fire"	Lou Diamond Phillips	Ed Redlich	February 26, 2023	T86.10113	4.66
14	"Family Tithes"	Mo McRae	Mike Flynn	March 5, 2023	T86.10114	4.72
15	"There Goes the Neighborhood"	Sharon Lewis	William Finkelstein	March 12, 2023	T86.10115	4.17
16	"Personal Shopper"	Mo McRae	Allison Intrieri & Jamie Lynn Harris	March 19, 2023	T86.10116	4.75
17	"Pound of Flesh"	Ramaa Mosley	Andrew Maher & Patrick Coker & Adam Wiesen	March 26, 2023	T86.10117	5.11
18	"In the Bag"	Michael M. Robin	Judith McCreary & Jacquelyn Reingold	April 16, 2023	T86.10118	4.77
19	"The Harder They Fall"	Lisa Leone	Ed Redlich & Jonathan Tolins	April 23, 2023	T86.10119	4.85
20	"A Humbling Blues"	Mo McRae	Mike Flynn	May 7, 2023	T86.10120	5.02
21	"Ruskin Roulette"	Michael M. Robin	William Finkelstein	May 14, 2023	T86.10121	4.68

== Production ==
On May 12, 2022, CBS picked up the series. Production took place in New York City, including the neighborhood of East New York, near where lead actor Smits grew up. On October 19, 2022, the series received a full season order. On October 24, 2022, it was reported that executive producers Christine Holder and Mark Holder were to exit the series. On May 8, 2023, CBS canceled the series after one season.

== Broadcast ==
East New York premiered on CBS on October 2, 2022. It aired on Sundays at 9:00 PM after The Equalizer and lead into NCIS: Los Angeles. In Canada, it aired on CTV Television Network. In Australia, it premiered on Foxtel and Binge on October 3, 2022, while in Italy it currently airs on Rete 4 only at night. In Latin America and Spain, it is available on HBO Max.

== Reception ==
=== Critical response ===
The review aggregator website Rotten Tomatoes reported an 88% approval rating with an average rating of 7.6/10, based on 8 critic reviews. Metacritic, which uses a weighted average, assigned a score of 68 out of 100 based on 5 critics, indicating "generally favorable reviews".

=== Ratings ===
Viewership and ratings per episode of East New York
No.	Title	Air date	Rating (18–49)	Viewers (millions)	DVR (18–49)	DVR viewers (millions)	Total (18–49)	Total viewers (millions)
1	"Pilot"	October 2, 2022	0.5	5.27	0.1	1.40	0.6	6.68 (Note: Live+7 ratings were unavailable, so Live+3 ratings have been used instead.)
2	"Misdemeanor Homicide"	October 9, 2022	0.4	5.65	0.2	1.42	0.6	7.07
3	"The Small Things"	October 16, 2022	0.6	5.44	0.2	1.78	0.7	7.22
4	"Snapped"	October 23, 2022	0.4	5.29	0.2	1.71	0.5	7.00
5	"Going Commando"	October 30, 2022	0.5	5.84	0.2	1.48	0.6	7.32
6	"Court on the Street"	November 6, 2022	0.4	4.93	0.2	1.80	0.6	6.73
7	"Best Served Cold"	November 13, 2022	0.3	4.70	—N/a	—N/a	—N/a	—N/a
8	"CompStat Interruptus"	November 20, 2022	0.4	4.97	—N/a	—N/a	—N/a	—N/a
9	"When Dinosaurs Roamed The Earth"	November 27, 2022	0.4	4.99	—N/a	—N/a	—N/a	—N/a
10	"10-13"	January 8, 2023	0.5	5.68	0.2	1.74	0.7	7.42
11	"By the Book"	January 15, 2023	0.4	5.27	0.2	1.71	0.6	6.98
12	"Up in Smoke"	February 19, 2023	0.3	4.24	—N/a	—N/a	—N/a	—N/a
13	"We Didn't Start the Fire"	February 26, 2023	0.4	4.66	—N/a	—N/a	—N/a	—N/a
14	"Family Tithes"	March 5, 2023	0.4	4.72	—N/a	—N/a	—N/a	—N/a
15	"There Goes the Neighborhood"	March 12, 2023	0.3	4.17	—N/a	—N/a	—N/a	—N/a
16	"Personal Shopper"	March 19, 2023	0.4	4.75	—N/a	—N/a	—N/a	—N/a
17	"Pound of Flesh"	March 26, 2023	0.4	5.11	—N/a	—N/a	—N/a	—N/a
18	"In the Bag"	April 16, 2023	0.3	4.77	—N/a	—N/a	—N/a	—N/a
19	"The Harder They Fall"	April 23, 2023	0.3	4.85	—N/a	—N/a	—N/a	—N/a
20	"A Humbling Blues"	May 7, 2023	0.3	5.02	—N/a	—N/a	—N/a	—N/a
21	"Ruskin Roulette"	May 14, 2023	0.3	4.68	—N/a	—N/a	—N/a	—N/a
