= Danny Strong =

American actor and screenwriter (born 1973/4)

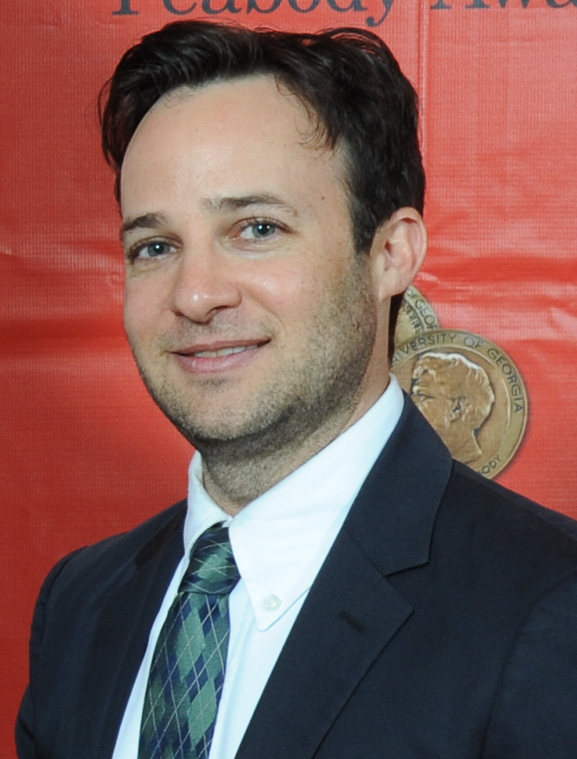
- Strong in 2013
- Born: 1973 or 1974 (age 52–53); Manhattan Beach, California, U.S.
- Education: University of Southern California
- Occupations: Actor, film, television writer, director, producer
- Years active: 1994–present
- Partner(s): Caitlin Mehner (2013–present; engaged)

Danny Strong (born 1973 or 1974) is an American actor, screenwriter, director, and producer. As an actor, Strong is best known for his roles as Jonathan Levinson in Buffy the Vampire Slayer, Doyle McMaster in Gilmore Girls and Danny Siegel in Mad Men. He also wrote the screenplays for Recount, the HBO adaptation Game Change, The Butler, and co-wrote the two-part finale of The Hunger Games film trilogy, Mockingjay – Part 1 and Mockingjay – Part 2. Strong also is a co-creator, executive producer, director, and writer for the Fox series Empire and created, wrote, and directed the award-winning Hulu miniseries Dopesick.

Strong has won two Emmy Awards, two Writers Guild of America Awards, a Producers Guild of America Award, two Peabody Awards and an NAACP Image Award.

== Early life, family and education ==
Strong was born in Manhattan Beach, California. He grew up in a Jewish family of Lithuanian, Russian, and Polish origin. He began acting at a young age. As a child, Strong rented videos from Video Archives and became friends with Quentin Tarantino, who worked there as a clerk: "I would just literally sit and chat with him for 45 minutes, an hour at a time about movies, and he got me turned on to all these different movies that 10-year-olds don't see." By the time he was 10, Strong became even more interested with the world of film and was sending his photo to agents.

Strong attended Mira Costa High School, and then studied film and theatre at the University of Southern California.

== Career ==
=== Acting ===
Strong is known for playing Jonathan Levinson on the television series Buffy the Vampire Slayer and Paris Geller's boyfriend Doyle McMaster on Gilmore Girls; he has also appeared in films such as Pleasantville, Dangerous Minds, Seabiscuit, the spoof Shriek If You Know What I Did Last Friday the Thirteenth, and was in the film Sydney White as the Grumpy dork, Gurkin. Strong has also had guest parts in sitcoms such as Seinfeld, Clueless, 3rd Rock from the Sun, Over the Top, Grey's Anatomy, Boy Meets World and How I Met Your Mother and has also guest-lectured in acting classes on finding a job as an actor. In the popular AMC series Mad Men he played Danny Siegel, a young man with no talent, trying to break into the advertising industry, later making a career in Hollywood. Strong also appeared on the HBO series Girls in the third and fourth seasons; and appeared on the fifth and sixth seasons of Justified as Albert Fekus, a rapist prison guard. He also starred in Billions as Todd Krakow, Secretary of the Treasury. Strong was set to appear in Once Upon a Time in Hollywood as Dean Martin, but his scenes were cut from the film.

=== Writing ===
At 25, in the hopes of being the lead actor in his own film, Strong wrote a dark comedy about two men who kill an elderly man for his rent-controlled apartment. The film never materialized, but it sparked his desire to become a full-time writer. His first successful script was Recount, a film about the 2000 US elections, produced by HBO and directed by Jay Roach. The film starred Kevin Spacey, Laura Dern, Denis Leary, John Hurt and Tom Wilkinson and premiered on May 25, 2008. The script was voted number one on the 2007 Hollywood Black List, a list of the "most liked" but unproduced scripts as voted on by the Hollywood community and insiders. Strong was nominated for a 2008 Emmy Award for Primetime Emmy Award for Outstanding Writing for a Miniseries, Movie or a Dramatic Special for Recount. The film was nominated for Best Television Miniseries or Film at the 66th Golden Globe Awards and won a Primetime Emmy Award for Outstanding Made for Television Movie as well as the Writers Guild of America Award for Best Original Screenplay for a Television movie.

Strong followed up Recount with the 2012 film adaptation of Game Change, based on the book written by John Heilemann and Mark Halperin. The film starred Julianne Moore and aired on HBO on March 10, 2012. In 2012, he won a Primetime Emmy Award for Outstanding Writing for a Miniseries, Movie or a Dramatic Special for Game Change. The film was also awarded a Peabody Award, which recognizes distinguished and meritorious public service by radio and television stations, networks, producing organizations and individuals.

In February 2012, he was hired to write the screenplay for the film adaptation of Dan Brown's The Lost Symbol, whose production has been stalled since 2013.

Strong wrote the screenplay for the film The Butler. Oprah Winfrey and Forest Whitaker starred in the film and it was directed by Lee Daniels. The script was voted onto the 2010 Hollywood Black List. It was released in August 2013 and grossed over $100 million in the US box office. Strong had a cameo in the film.

I write characters of every race, gender and sexual orientation. I write some characters that are animals. That's just my job. To me, writing 'Empire' is not more difficult than Sarah Palin [in 'Game Change']. ... I mean, I'm not a Republican from Alaska.

— Danny Strong, HuffPost interview, June 2015

In December 2013, Strong signed on to pen the new screenplay for the film adaptation of the musical Guys and Dolls, which originally premiered on Broadway in 1950. Strong co-created the TV series Empire with Lee Daniels in 2014, for which he wrote and directed multiple episodes. Strong co-wrote the two-part Mockingjay, the finale of The Hunger Games series. Part 1 was released on November 21, 2014, and Part 2 was released on November 20, 2015.

Strong created Dopesick, a Hulu exclusive miniseries in October 2021 that explores the Sackler family, and Purdue Pharma's role in the opioid epidemic in the United States. The series was influenced by Beth Macy's book by the same name and starred Michael Keaton, who earned a SAG award for his performance. The critically acclaimed show was nominated for 14 Emmy Awards and won the Peabody Award along with many other awards and honors.

Strong wrote the book for the rock musical Galileo; it premiered at Berkeley Repertory Theatre in 2024, and will open on Broadway at the Shubert Theatre in December 2026. Strong also wrote the book for the 2025 Broadway revival of Chess in early 2025, after having written an earlier book for a 2018 Kennedy Center production of Chess directed by Michael Mayer, who later directed the Broadway revival. Previews of the Broadway revival of Chess begin on October 15, with opening night slated for November 16.

=== Directing ===
Strong made his directorial debut with the biographical film on the life of author J. D. Salinger, Rebel in the Rye. The film premiered at the 2017 Sundance Film Festival and was distributed by IFC Films. He followed this up by directing the last two episodes of the award-winning limited series Dopesick for he which he was nominated for a Primetime Emmy Award and a Directors Guild Award for Best Director of a Limited Series. He has also directed several episodes of Empire.

== Personal life ==
Strong became engaged to actress Caitlin Mehner on December 29, 2016, in Hawaii after meeting her three years earlier.

== Filmography ==
=== Film ===
Year	Title	Writer	Director	Producer
2013	The Butler	Yes	No	Executive
2014	The Hunger Games: Mockingjay – Part 1	Yes	No	No
2015	The Hunger Games: Mockingjay – Part 2	Yes	No	No
2017	Rebel in the Rye	Yes	Yes	Yes
2019	The Best of Enemies	No	No	Yes

Acting roles

Year	Title	Role	Notes
1995	Dangerous Minds	Student	
1998	The Prophecy II	Julian	Video
1998	Pleasantville	Juke Box Boy	
2000	Shriek If You Know What I Did Last Friday the 13th	Boner	Video
2003	Seabiscuit	Young Jockey	
2006	Veritas, Prince of Truth	Raymond	
2007	Sydney White	Gurkin	
2009	Weather Girl	Kurt	
2013	The Butler	Freedom Bus Journalist	
2015	Knight of Cups	Danny Strong	
2016	Popstar: Never Stop Never Stopping	Perspective Manipulator	

=== Television ===
TV movies

Year	Title	Writer	Producer
2008	Recount	Yes	Co-producer
2012	Game Change	Yes	Co-executive

TV series

Year	Title	Writer	Director	Executive producer	Creator
2015–2020	Empire	Yes	Yes	Yes	Yes
2019	Proven Innocent	Yes	Yes	Yes	No
2020	The Right Stuff	No	No	Yes	No
2021	Dopesick	Yes	Yes	Yes	Yes

Acting roles

Year	Title	Role	Notes
1994	Saved by the Bell: The New Class	Stanley / Noogie	5 episodes
1996	Minor Adjustments	Peter	Episode: "Ask Dr. Ron"
1996	Boy Meets World	Arthur	Episode: "The Heart Is a Lonely Hunter"
1996	3rd Rock from the Sun	Aramis	Episode: "World's Greatest Dick"
1996	Hey Arnold!	Teenagers (voice)	Episode: "Mugged/Roughin' It"
1996	Night Stand with Dick Dietrick	Tommy	Episode: "The Secret Crush Show"
1997	Seinfeld	Vincent	Episode: "The Comeback"
1997	Union Square	Bill	Episode: "The Audition"
1997	Over the Top	Jesse	2 episodes
1997–1999	Clueless	Marshall Gasner	9 episodes
1997–2003	Buffy the Vampire Slayer	Jonathan Levinson	28 episodes
2001	Maybe It's Me	Mini-Jerry	Episode: "The Mini-Jerry Episode"
2003–2007	Gilmore Girls	Doyle McMaster	21 episodes
2004	Johnny Bravo	Zandahan (voice)	Episode: "Mini JB/Back from the Future"
2004	Dragnet		Episode: "Frame of Mind"
2006	Danger Rangers	Mickey (voice)	Episode: "Cave Save"
2006	Nip/Tuck	Bart	Episode: "Gala Gallardo"
2009	Leverage	Dennis Retzing	Episode: "The Snow Job"
2010–2013	Mad Men	Danny Siegel	5 episodes
2011	How I Met Your Mother	Trey	Episode: "Last Words"
2012	Grey's Anatomy	Paul	Episode: "The Lion Sleeps Tonight"
2014–2015	Girls	Pal	2 episodes
2014–2015	Justified	Albert Fekus	4 episodes
2016	Love	Director	Episode: "One Long Day"
2016	Gilmore Girls: A Year in the Life	Doyle McMaster	2 episodes
2017–2023	Billions	Todd Krakow	18 episodes
2020	The Right Stuff	Shorty Powers	6 episodes
2023	The Marvelous Mrs. Maisel	Aaron Lebowitz	Episode: "The Testi-Roastial"

=== Theater ===
Year	Title	Notes	Ref.
2018	Chess	Revised book	
2024	Galileo	Book	

== Awards and nominations ==
Year	Association	Category	Nominated work	Result
2008	Primetime Emmy Awards	Outstanding Writing for a Limited or Anthology Series or Movie	Recount	Nominated
2008	American Film Institute Top 10	TV Program of the Year	Recount	Won
2009	Writers Guild of America Awards	Long Form – Original	Recount	Won
2012	Primetime Emmy Awards	Outstanding TV Movie	Game Change	Won
2012	Primetime Emmy Awards	Outstanding Writing for a Limited or Anthology Series or Movie	Game Change	Won
2012	American Film Institute Top 10	TV Program of the Year	Game Change	Won
2013	Golden Globe Awards	Best Limited or Anthology Series or TV Film	Game Change	Won
2013	Peabody Award		Game Change	Won
2013	Producers Guild of America Awards	Best Long-Form TV	Game Change	Won
2013	Writers Guild of America Awards	TV: Long Form – Adapted	Game Change	Won
2013	PEN Center USA Awards	Best Teleplay	Game Change	Won
2014	NAACP Image Award	Outstanding Writing in a Motion Picture	The Butler	Nominated
2014	Pell Center Prize for Story in the Public Square	Recognizing a contemporary storyteller whose work has had a significant impact on the public dialogue.	Game Change, Recount, The Butler	Won
2015	TCA Awards	Program of the Year	Empire	Won
2015	AFI Award	Television Program of the Year	Empire	Won
2016	NAACP Image Award	Outstanding Drama Series	Empire	Won
2016	NAACP Image Award	Outstanding Writing in a Dramatic Series	Empire	Nominated
2016	Critics' Choice Television Award	Best Drama Series	Empire	Nominated
2016	Golden Globe Awards	Best Television Series – Drama	Empire	Nominated
2022	Final Draft Awards	TV Writer of the Year	Dopesick	Won
2022	TCA Awards	Best Limited Series	Dopesick	Won
2022	Golden Globe Awards	Best Limited Series	Dopesick	Nominated
2022	Television Academy Honors		Dopesick	Won
2022	Peabody Award		Dopesick	Won
2022	Primetime Emmy Awards	Outstanding Directing for a Limited or Anthology Series or Movie	Dopesick	Nominated
2022	Primetime Emmy Awards	Outstanding Writing for a Limited or Anthology Series or Movie	Dopesick	Nominated
2022	Primetime Emmy Awards	Outstanding Limited or Anthology Series	Dopesick	Nominated
2022	USC Scripter Awards	Best TV Adaptation	Dopesick	Won
2022	Producers Guild of America Awards	Best Limited Series	Dopesick	Nominated
2022	Directors Guild of America Award	Best Director of a Limited Series	Dopesick	Nominated
2022	Final Draft Awards	Storyteller of the Year for Television	Dopesick	Won
2022	GLAAD Awards	Best Limited Series	Dopesick	Nominated
2022	Critics Choice Awards	Best Limited Series	Dopesick	Nominated
2026	Drama Desk Awards	Best Revival of a Musical	Chess	Nominated
2026	Outer Critics Circle Awards	Best Revival of a Musical	Chess	Nominated
2026	Drama League Awards	Best Revival of a Musical	Chess	Nominated
2026	Broadway.com Audience Choice Awards	Favorite Musical Revival	Chess	Won
