= Lez Bomb =

- Directed by: Jenna Laurenzo
- Written by: Jenna Laurenzo
- Produced by: Ryan R. Johnson; Jenna Laurenzo; Rob Moran; Martin Sprock
- Starring: Jenna Laurenzo; Caitlin Mehner; Brandon Micheal Hall; Steve Guttenberg; Elaine Hendrix; Deirdre O'Connell; Rob Moran; Davram Stiefler; A.B. Cassidy; Jordyn DiNatale; Bruce Dern; Kevin Pollak; Cloris Leachman
- Cinematography: Gabriel Stanley
- Edited by: Bill Saunders
- Music by: PT Walkley
- Distributed by: Gravitas Ventures
- Release dates: June 16, 2018 (Frameline Film Festival); November 9, 2018 (United States)
- Running time: 90 minutes
- Country: United States
- Language: English

Lez Bomb is a 2018 American comedy-drama film written by, directed by and starring Jenna Laurenzo. Bobby Farrelly served as an executive producer of the film.

== Plot ==
Lauren is a young woman living in Jersey City who travels back to her hometown of Ramsey, New Jersey for the Thanksgiving holiday. Lauren is a closeted lesbian who has not yet come out to her dysfunctional and conservative family; she finally decides to do so by inviting her lover, Hailey, over to meet at her parents' house. However, Lauren's male roommate, Austin, shows up and Lauren's parents mistake him for her boyfriend. Lauren persuades Austin to go along with the charade until she has the courage to tell her family the truth about herself.

== Cast ==
- Jenna Laurenzo as Lauren
- Caitlin Mehner as Hailey
- Brandon Micheal Hall as Austin
- Steve Guttenberg as Mike
- Elaine Hendrix as Maggie
- Dierdre O'Connell as Rose
- Rob Moran as Ken
- Davram Stiefler as John
- Bruce Dern as Grandpa
- Kevin Pollak as George
- Cloris Leachman as Josephine
- A.B. Cassidy as Emma
- Jordyn DiNatale as Jessica
- Dorothi Fox as Ronnie

== Reception ==
The film has an 89% rating on Rotten Tomatoes.

== Accolade ==
The film won the Jury Award for Narrative Feature at the Bentonville Film Festival.
