= Tru Loved =

2008 film by Stewart Wade

- Promotional Poster
- Directed by: Stewart Wade
- Written by: Stewart Wade
- Produced by: David Avallone; Antonio Brown; Stewart Wade
- Starring: Najarra Townsend; Jake Abel; Matthew Thompson; Alexandra Paul
- Cinematography: Howard Wexler
- Edited by: David Avallone
- Music by: Chris Nicolaides
- Production companies: BrownBag Productions (II); Tru Loved
- Distributed by: Regent Releasing here! Films
- Release date: February 28, 2008
- Running time: 102 minutes
- Country: United States
- Language: English
- Box office: $9,467

Tru Loved is a 2008 independent film written and directed by Stewart Wade and starring Najarra Townsend, Jake Abel, Matthew Thompson and Alexandra Paul.

== Plot ==
Sixteen-year-old Tru has been raised in San Francisco by two lesbian mothers and two gay fathers. When one of her mothers gets a well-paid job in a multi-cultural but more conservative suburb in Southern California, Tru and her mothers relocate.

When Tru first starts at her new school, teachers welcome her but a group of male football jocks and their female friends bully her and say she looks like a "dyke." One of the footballers, Lodell, changes his mind about her and they start dating, but the relationship never becomes sexual. When they attend The Marvelous Wonderettes musical, Lodell flirts with a man. Tru's fathers suggest that Lodell is gay, and when Tru questions him he finally, reluctantly admits that he is a closeted homosexual. She tells him that she "doesn't want to be his Katie Holmes" but agrees to be his beard so he can continue to be accepted at school.

Tru begins to spend time with Lodell's best friend, fellow footballer Manuel, but when he bullies openly gay classmate Walter, Tru defends Walter and they become friends. They try to establish a Gay Straight Alliance and although a conservative teacher and a closeted English teacher refuse to support the group, the school drama teacher agrees to be the faculty sponsor. The first meeting is successful, with several people attending a long discussion on same-sex marriage in California, but during football practice at the same time, the coach calls the players "ladies," rants that "kids can't even say prayers in class, but the fags... get their own club!" He then asks his team if they want to "put a little muscles into these plays or go meet [their] boyfriends at the Gay Scouts of America," to which they answer that they want to "play ball."

At the end of the Gay Straight Alliance meeting Tru meets a gay-rights supporter, hipster-geek senior Trevor. She initially thinks he's gay, but they quickly form an intimate relationship. Raised by his gay fiction-author uncle, Trevor is open-minded about Tru's family arrangement. Later, Tru discovers that Lodell and Walter are sexually involved, and she ends her faux-relationship with Lodell. When Lodell and his teammates destroy a Gay Straight Alliance banner, Trevor sends out a mass coming out e-mail from Lodell's account. Tru is upset by this but eventually forgives him.

Tru's mothers have a small backyard commitment ceremony attended by teachers and other locals. Lodell arrives to announce that he has left another faux-relationship, and he has the opportunity to reconcile with Walter and meet David Kopay. Manuel arrives with his football coach and punches Lodell for not revealing his sexuality. He refuses to accept homosexuality, but promises to continue being a friend to Lodell. Lodell performs a self-penned song, the school principal dances with Trevor's uncle, and the closeted English teacher is advised by friend and fellow teacher Ms. Maple (Jane Lynch) to be open about his sexuality. In the short final scene, Lodell comes out to his mother and grandmother and introduces Walter as his boyfriend.

== Cast ==
- Najarra Townsend as Tru
- Jake Abel as Trevor, Tru's Boyfriend
- Matthew Thompson as Lodell, Tru's Faux Boyfriend
- Alexandra Paul as Leslie
- Cynda Williams as Lisa
- Alec Mapa as Mr. Bushnell, Closeted English Teacher
- Bruce Vilanch as Uncle Daniel, Trevor's Uncle and Guardian
- Nichelle Nichols as Lodell's Grandmother
- Jasmine Guy as Cynthia
- Jane Lynch as Ms. Maple, School Teacher
- Elaine Hendrix as Mrs. Muller, School Teacher
- Tye Olson as Walter, Lodell's Boyfriend
- Joseph Julian Soria as Manuel, Lodell's Best Friend
- Tony Brown as Principal Velasquez, School Principal
- Vernon Wells as Coach Wesley, Lodell's Football Coach
- Marcia Wallace as Mrs. Lewis
- Peter Bedard as Dom
- Shani Pride as Tiffany
- Jenn Shagrin as Adrienne
- Thomas Saunders as Emmet
- Ellie Gerber as Rhonda
- Howard Booth as Joe
- Bryan Erickson as Roberto
- Matthew Miles Carter as Student
- Jay Costelo as Pierced Boy, Gay Straight Alliance Member
- Morgan Early as Punk Girl, Gay Straight Alliance Member
- Isabelle Gunning as Voice On High School P.A. System
- Katta Hules as Goth Girl, Gay Straight Alliance Member
- Brad Hunter as Student
- Cody Kennedy as Brittney
- Derek Kokinda as Young Man
- David Kopay as Himself
- Scott Presley as Bell Aire
- Jennifer Riker as Nurse Bette

== Reception ==
The film premiered at the Sedona Film Festival on 28 February 2008 and at the Frameline Film Festival on 21 June 2008. It received 14 awards at six film festivals. The film went into limited national release on 17 October 2008.

As of June 2020, the film holds a 39% approval rating on Rotten Tomatoes, based on 18 reviews with an average rating of 4.66/10. Kevin Thomas of the Los Angeles Times called the film "engaging, timely and courageous", but the Chicago Reader called it "worthless drivel for the gay-lesbian market". Film critic Roger Ebert caused a controversy when his published review of the film revealed that he had stopped watching after only eight minutes, making it one of only four films he walked out on (the others being Caligula, Jonathan Livingston Seagull, and The Statue). He explained: "At what turned out to be the eight-minute mark, I paused the disc, looked at my notes so far, and thought, 'There's my review right there.' The movie had left me not wanting to see more." He later watched and reviewed the entire film and promised to never again review a film he had not seen "in its entirety. Never. Ever." In his review of the full film, Ebert gave it one star and suggested that the film would be appealing primarily to younger gay teenagers, and that "[t]he actors all have to deal with roles that are under- or over-written, and with characters that are one-dimensional stereotypes (the coach, the grandmother, both gay dad parents)."
