= Fading of the Cries =

- Film poster
- Directed by: Steven McGuire
- Written by: Steven Maguire; Brian Metcalf (original story)
- Produced by: Thomas Ian Nicholas; Karoline Kautz; Brian Metcalf; Ben Chan
- Starring: Thomas Ian Nicholas; Brad Dourif; Mackenzie Rosman; Elaine Hendrix; Hallee Hirsh; Jordan Matthews; Lateef Crowder; Jessica Morris; Julia Whelan as Emily
- Cinematography: Brad Rushing
- Edited by: Steven McGuire
- Music by: Nathaniel Levisay
- Production companies: Fading of the Cries; Foresight Media Group; Ratio Pictures
- Distributed by: Lionsgate Home Entertainment; Eammon Films; Underhill Films
- Release date: July 8, 2008
- Running time: 90 minutes
- Country: United States
- Language: English

Fading of the Cries is a 2008 American horror fantasy film starring Brad Dourif, Thomas Ian Nicholas, Mackenzie Rosman, Elaine Hendrix and Jordan Matthews.

== Plot ==
Jacob is a young man who defends his town from evil forces, aided by a magic sword. He saves a girl called Sarah from a horde of the reanimated dead, and they escape through the floor of a church. An evil necromancer named Mathias confronts Sarah and demands an amulet given to her by her uncle before he died. Sarah refuses, and after threatening to unleash all the evils he can conjure, Mathias disappears.

In the morning, Sarah and Jacob return to Sarah's house through streets, fields, churches and tunnels, pursued by hordes of demonic creatures. They arrive around midday to find Mathias is already there, holding a sword to Sarah's little sister Jill's throat. Mathias threatens to kill Jill unless Sarah gives him the amulet. Sarah makes Mathias promise he will let Jill go, and gives him the amulet. Mathias disappears with both Jill and the necklace, and Sarah begs Jacob to go save Jill from Mathias. Jacob reluctantly agrees.

Jacob arrives at Sarah's dead uncle's house and fights Mathias. He manages to destroy the amulet, defeating Mathias, but Jill falls through a hole in the floor. Jacob dives after her and breaks her fall with his own body, unharmed himself because he cannot die due to a protection spell that Sarah's uncle cast before he died. They return to Jill's home. Her mother and her sister Sarah are dead, killed by the reanimated dead while Jacob was not there to protect them.

Jacob returns to Sarah's uncle's house to find Mathias reading through his necromancer spells, looking for a way to restore his power. Mathias laughs and boasts that he cannot be killed because he is already dead. Jacob says grimly that he is not there to kill Mathias; instead he will torture Mathias for all eternity. The movie fades out with Jacob repeatedly slashing Mathias with his sword and the sounds of Mathias's screams filling the air.

== Cast ==
- Brad Dourif as Mathias
- Thomas Ian Nicholas as Michael
- Elaine Hendrix as Maggie
- Hallee Hirsh as Sarah
- Mackenzie Rosman as Jill
- Jordan Matthews as Jacob
- Lateef Crowder as Sylathus
- Jessica Morris as Malyhne
- Julia Whelan as Emily

== Release ==
The film was first released on July 8, 2008. It was released theatrically in Los Angeles on June 24, 2011, and in New York City on July 8, 2011.

== Reception ==
Critical reception for Fading of the Cries was negative. On the film review aggregator Rotten Tomatoes, it received a 0% "Rotten" rating, with an average rating of 2.34/10 based on 7 reviews. Metacritic reported a weighted average score of 11 out of 100, indicating "overwhelming dislike".

Critics generally agreed that the film failed even by the standards of low-budget horror films. The New York Times described it as "a nonsensical horror-romance hybrid with bats for brains... with a script that might have been written by three drunken monkeys." Vadim Rizov of Box Office Magazine wrote that the film was "too dull for camp and too bad to be taken seriously." Andrew Shenker of the Village Voice wrote, "No one expects perfect coherence - or competent acting - from a low-budget horror picture, but this convoluted mess sets new lows in underimagined, overplotted narrative - not to mention grade-Z thesping and dimly portentous dialogue." The Los Angeles Times commented that the film occasionally had "naive charms" in the vein of Super 8, but was often "spit-take ridiculous" and that "enthusiasm isn't exactly a replacement for good sense or basic skills." Variety called the film so plotless that it might have been a failed anthology, and wrote that "If someone took a handful of VHS tapes from the horror/fantasy shelf of an early '90s video store, plunked them in a blender and hit puree, the result would look something like the ineptly titled "Fading of the Cries," a lumpy melange of supernatural ingredients and distinct genre elements that never cohere."

Reviews on IMDb stands at a 3.1 out of 100, the negatives are also mainly negative, with users pointing out the vague feeling of the plot. Many horror-bloggers have also mentioned this criticism.
