= Proven Innocent =

2019 American legal drama television series

- Intertitle
- Genre: Legal drama
- Created by: David Elliot
- Starring: Rachelle Lefevre; Russell Hornsby; Nikki M. James; Vincent Kartheiser; Riley Smith; Kelsey Grammer; Clare O'Connor
- Composer: Bear McCreary
- Country of origin: United States
- Original language: English
- No. of seasons: 1
- No. of episodes: 13

Production
- Executive producers: David Elliot; Danny Strong; Stacy Greenberg
- Production companies: Danny Strong Productions; Leap Boy Productions; 20th Century Fox Television

Original release
- Network: Fox
- Release: February 15 – May 10, 2019

Proven Innocent is an American legal drama television series created by David Elliot, which premiered on February 15, 2019, on Fox. The series follows the employees of a wrongful conviction law firm and stars Rachelle Lefevre, Russell Hornsby, Nikki M. James, Vincent Kartheiser, Riley Smith, Kelsey Grammer, and Clare O'Connor. On May 11, 2019, Fox canceled the series after one season.

== Cast and characters ==
=== Main ===
- Rachelle Lefevre as Madeline Scott, a lawyer specializing in wrongful convictions, driven by the experience of spending ten years in prison for the murder of her best friend Rosemary, even though she didn't commit it. She studied for pre-law while in prison and graduated Yale at the top of her class once she was released. She is sometimes prone to becoming overzealous in attempting to achieve her goals, but has made it clear more than once that she draws a line between 'not guilty' and 'innocent', constantly determined to prove her clients' innocence due to the challenges they would face if released under 'not guilty'.
  - Clare O'Connor as Young Madeline Scott
- Russell Hornsby as Ezekiel "EZ" Boudreau, a former reinsurance lawyer who got Madeline's conviction overturned and now works as a senior member of her firm. He was the 2,736th lawyer Madeline wrote to when trying to prove her innocence while in prison (based on the number at the bottom of the letter Madeline sent him). He is religious, but has shown a willingness to compromise his religious views in extreme cases; for example, while he objects to abortion, he agrees that a twenty-five-year sentence was too extreme for a mother accused of killing her baby.
- Nikki M. James as Violet Bell, the firm's media consultant and the host of a podcast. She often offers advice on how they might present a case to the public, based on countering Madeline's own experience when she was presented as a party girl after the death of Rosemary when that night was the first time Madeline drank at all.
- Vincent Kartheiser as Bodie Quick, the firm's chief investigator. He has shown a fondness for going undercover even when a simpler approach might be better and displays a wide range of skills.
- Riley Smith as Levi Scott, Madeline's brother struggles with an oxycodone addiction resulting from the trauma of imprisonment. Unlike his sister, he has struggled to move on from his conviction.
- Kelsey Grammer as Gore Bellows, the Cook County state attorney, whose celebrated career has long been shadowed by allegations of multiple wrongful convictions, including those of Madeline and Levi Scott. He is generally shown as going for the easiest solution to cases even when alternatives are possible, preferring a quick and easy trial to more in-depth investigations, although he attempts to present himself as merely misguided or misinformed when Madeline's team proves him wrong, such as when they confirmed that one conviction was based on a translator deliberately doctoring the transcript of a preacher who didn't speak English to create the impression that the man claimed his wife never wanted children when Bellows sentenced her to prison for killing her child.

=== Recurring ===
- Elaine Hendrix as Susan Andrews, a high-profile reporter linked to the Bellows campaign.
- Laurie Holden as Greta Bellows, Gore's shrewish wife. She often encourages him to attack Madeline in his own campaign for attorney general, but Bellows resists this idea to avoid making Madeline's case a major issue.
- Caitlin Mehner as Heather Husband (née Dupinski), a relative of Rosemary Lynch who believes in Madeline's guilt and derides her as a criminal, to the point that her husband deliberately provoked Levi into attacking him just to ruin Levi's chances of staying out of jail.
- Tembi Locke as Vanessa Dale
- Tiffany Dupont as Nikki Russo, a cop and Bodie's love interest from whom he occasionally solicits favors. They break up when Bodie uses evidence she gave him to take down a dirty cop, which she views as a breach of trust.
- Catherine Lidstone as Isabel Sanchez, a young, hungry prosecutor who views Bellows as a mentor. She is essentially a "counterpart" to Madeline as their lives were each ruined by a flawed court case, albeit from different sides; where Madeline was wrongfully convicted of a crime she did not commit, Sanchez's mother was killed by a man who was cleared of an assault charge just a month prior to her mother's death, with Bellows as the prosecuting attorney.
- Candice Coke as Wren Grant, a prison inmate and Madeline's girlfriend.
- Jeffrey Nordling as Rick Zahn alias Ravi, cult leader and rapist, main donor to Bellows campaign

== Episodes ==
No.	Title	Directed by	Written by	Original release date	Prod. code	U.S. viewers (millions)
1	"Pilot"	Patricia Riggen	David Elliot	February 15, 2019	1LBT01	3.08
After being found guilty of murder as a teenager, Chicago attorney Madeline Scott dedicates herself to freeing the falsely convicted. Her newest client, Harvey Birkbeck, is freed after prosecutor Gore Bellows agrees to vacate his conviction before announcing his candidacy for state attorney general. Madeline and her team take up the case of Lucia Rincon, a woman convicted of murdering her child. Madeline’s brother Levi gets in a fight with the family of Rosemary Lynch, the girl they were accused of killing, and Madeline has to defend him in court. Despite coming up with evidence of suppression that could sink Bellows’ campaign, the team persuades Madeline to use it as leverage to free Lucia. Bellows agrees, but only if Lucia pleads guilty to child endangerment. Madeline convinces her to seek an appeal instead. Levi gets fired from his coaching job, causing him to relapse; he admits a secret relationship with Rosemary to Madeline that he lied about in court. Facing a hostile judge, the team proves that Bellows submitted false testimony from Lucia’s husband, forcing the court to declare her innocent. In a flashback, a young Madeline discovers Levi standing over Rosemary’s body.
2	"The Burden of Truth"	Howie Deutch	Danny Strong & Adam Armus	February 22, 2019	1LBT02	2.07
Madeline finds herself balancing the case of Tamara Folsom, a woman sentenced to life for murder after an alleged rape, and her brother, who faces arrest for failing to show up in court. When the evidence in Tamara’s case disappears from storage, the team manages to track down the man who tried to rape her, but the judge refuses to grant a new trial without hard evidence. Bellows welcomes a new female prosecutor, Isabel Sanchez, to his office, to his wife’s annoyance. Madeline finds Levi in a homeless camp, and he confirms his relationship with Rosemary. With his poll numbers sinking due to Madeline’s intense criticism of his record, Bellows is told to smear her in return, but ultimately chooses not to, to avoid making her a campaign issue. The team identifies a potential new suspect, Celeste Adams, but they find nothing to suggest she’s the killer. Easy’s wife confronts him for putting his career before his family. Violet discovers that Celeste was working as a prostitute at the time Tamara was convicted, and that the murdered man was her pimp. Easy and Madeline identify the real murderer as one of Celeste’s handlers, and Tamara is set free. Madeline visits Rosemary’s grave, and swears to find her killer.
3	"A Minor Confession"	Elodie Keene	Wendy West	March 1, 2019	1LBT03	2.57
Easy is recruited by his pastor to free William Hurston, a 19-year old who has spent five years in prison for a murder he falsely confessed to. The team gets a new trial by proving juror misconduct, but Bodie soon learns that a potential new suspect, a man named Rabbit, is already dead. Boudreau’s fury over the case and issues with his son Michael at home make him exceedingly tense and testy at work. Madeline campaigns for Bellows’ opponent, so Bellows arranges for Rosemary’s mother to indirectly criticize her in the media. Levi’s plea deal is revoked after a man he assaulted submits new evidence that convinces the prosecution to seek trial. With information from Bodie, Easy discredits Bellows' star witness; Bellows responds by discrediting Madeline’s witness. Easy admits that he fears what happened to William will happen to Michael. The team decides to put William on the stand, and with a strong closing argument from Easy, they win over the jury and free him. Violet finds a new link between Levi and Rosemary by looking at travel logs. Levi enters Madeline's home uninvited to explain, but leaves once he realizes that she is now scared of him.
4	"The Shame Game"	Howie Deutch	Danny Strong	March 8, 2019	1LBT04	1.90
A lawyer refers his client, Sarah Bukhari, to the team; Bukhari, a Muslim woman, faces a retrial on charges of murdering her baby despite her claim that it was stillborn; Easy’s personal disapproval of abortion is enough for him to refuse to assist Madeline on the case. Gore puts the finishing touches on “Rosemary’s Law”, a bill designed solely to ruin Madeline’s firm and her career. Bodie brings in an eccentric expert witness, but the judge, a conservative Christian, demonstrates his bias by asking highly selective questions focused on the idea of the baby being killed. Easy, torn between his beliefs and his sense of justice, offers his help by proposing that Madeline focus on Sarah’s state of mind to sway the judge; a conversation with her parents reveals Sarah chose to hide her pregnancy because the father, Ben Bollinger, was a Catholic whom they had forbidden her to date. Gore intimidates a key state senator into supporting his bill. Easy convinces Sarah to testify, but only the intervention of a sympathetic female prosecutor forces the judge to release her based on time served. Madeline discovers that Rosemary may have been abusing Adderall at the time of her death.
5	"Cross to Bear"	Mario Van Peebles	Stacy A. Littlejohn	March 15, 2019	1LBT05	1.97
Madeline's latest client is intimidated into withdrawing from court by Richard Falcone, a corrupt cop. After being briefly jailed for contempt following an emotional outburst, she decides to find a new client solely to discredit him. Her choice is Ronnie Peterson, a supposedly reformed white supremacist framed by Falcone for a hate crime; Violet disagrees and refuses to help. Levi goes after Toby Kissell, who testified against him and who he believes might have killed Rosemary. Falcone has the team harassed for investigating him, and Easy's son calls him a hypocrite for defending Peterson. Bodie picks up a witness who gets arrested just before he can testify, causing Peterson to yell a racial slur at Easy. Madeline kicks Kissell out of her office when he comes to complain. Bodie locates Falcone's dirty former partner, but he refuses to testify without immunity. Violet reconciles with Madeline when she admits she was wrong to ignore the latter's concerns. Bellows agrees to grant immunity, but not for Peterson's case; Greta persuades him to change his mind. Falcone is arrested, Bellows smears his opponent for protecting him, and Peterson goes free. Kissell hangs himself out of guilt.
6	"A Cinderhella Story"	Rashaad Ernesto Green	Adam Armus & David Elliot	March 22, 2019	1LBT06	2.33
Madeline receives a personal plea from Adele Meyerson, convicted of killing her adoptive mother Jane. Adele points them towards Grant Thargard, who testified against her. A researcher who has been following Adele's case informs the team that he suspects Jane was killed by Carter Leopold, who was linked to five other murders, but was acquitted. Leopold pleads the Fifth, creating enough reasonable doubt that the jury finds Adele innocent. Violet shows Madeline a recording revealing that Adele was guilty and manipulated the team into freeing her.
7	"Living and Dying in East Cleveland"	Sharat Raju	Tina Mabry	March 29, 2019	1LBT07	1.92
A civil rights activist, Amina Jackson, challenges Madeline to defend Davon Watkins, a drug dealer sentenced to death for killing narcotics officer Steve Sampson. Davon claims that he was set up by the police using a tainted witness, which Madeline verifies. Madeline, Violet, and Amina learn from Nancy that Sampson's death was premeditated. A friend of Davon's identifies Sampson's killer, who agrees to testify but gets killed before he can. Madeline gets a judge to grant a stay of execution for Davon's case until she can gather more evidence. A flashback shows Madeline's first meeting with Easy, who he determines that Rosemary was struck in the head with a rusty pipe rather than a rock as was claimed in the original trial.
8	"The Struggle for Stonewall"	Danny Strong	Danny Strong & Tesia Walker	April 5, 2019	1LBT08	1.70
Madeline takes on a difficult case: Cindy Whitman, a transgender woman who allegedly murdered trans rights activist Vanessa Evans in 1982. However, Cindy is unwilling to leave prison, because she knows nothing else. Violet's hero, Ira Glass, makes a guest appearance on her podcast, and later asks her to dinner. Bellows pressures Sanchez to find something he can use to charge Madeline, since doing so would win him the election. While out in the field, Bodie is mistaken for a gay man and attacked. Ira offers Violet the chance to host her own show, but only if she leaves the team. The team looks at Thomas Stone, a gay rights advocate who argued with Vanessa, but when he is cleared of suspicion, Violet illegally obtains medical files belonging to the late wife of Vanessa's former boyfriend; Madeline forces him to reveal in court that she killed Vanessa out of jealousy. Sanchez gets Levi drunk, and learns that Madeline didn't join in the search for Rosemary before she was found dead. Violet tells Ira that she loves her work too much to accept his offer. Cindy is nervous about her freedom, but Thomas welcomes her back to his bar with open arms. Madeline decides to come out as bisexual to her mother.
9	"Acceptable Losses"	Anna Mastro	William N. Fordes & Rachel Borders	April 12, 2019	1LBT09	1.74
Daniel Hernandez, a convicted rapist and murderer, provides the firm with DNA evidence exonerating him, but before they can tackle the case, Madeline is called to Ohio to assist Davon when his execution order is reinstated. Easy is able to get Hernandez cleared of rape, but the judge, his former law instructor Elijah Fry, refuses to vacate the murder conviction. Unable to block the order, Madeline targets Troy Dalton, the gang leader who framed Davon. Easy and Bodie use the DNA evidence to track down another woman who was raped by the real killer, a lawyer named Bob Calloway, but Fry blocks them from collecting his DNA. Levi prods Linda for information on other former students who abused Adderall. Easy and Bodie get Galloway's friend Eddie DuBar to testify against him; Judge Fry calls the hearing off when he becomes confused about whether or not a jury is present. Bellows decides to support restoring the death penalty even though he doesn't personally favor it. Judge Fry realizes that he has dementia and retires from the bench; his replacement clears Hernandez of murder. Davon's final appeal is denied, and his execution is carried out despite an emergency motion to the Supreme Court and an appeal for clemency. Wren is granted parole.
10	"SEAL Team Deep Six"	Elodie Keene	Aaron Carew	April 19, 2019	1LBT10	1.90
Madeline gets Wren a job to help with her parole, and Nikki and Bodie decide to start over. The firm is brought into the case of Navy seaman Rachel Clarke, a former SEAL candidate framed for the murder of naval commander Chris Moore. In the face of harassment by naval authorities, they manage to uncover evidence of a cover-up and get three days to prove their case. Levi confronts Heather and gets a clue about somewhere called "Sparrow Ridge". Sparrow Ridge turns out to be an abandoned house, and when Levi and Madeline search it, they find the names of Rosemary and Heather's clique in the basement.
11	"Shaken"	Jon Amiel	Terri Kopp & Adam Scott Weissman	April 26, 2019	1LBT11	1.69
When a medical examiner who delivered numerous diagnoses of 'Shaken Baby Syndrome' announces that new findings have come to light suggesting that many of the apparently 'definitive' symptoms can actually be caused by medical issues, the team are called upon to re-examine the case of Gabrielle Parcell, who was accused of killing her daughter in a moment of postpartum depression. New analysis of the infant's medical reports determines that death could have been caused by an injury sustained up to five days before death rather than the night before as previously believed, leading the team to uncover a long-hidden history of child abuse on the part of Deborah Vanderhey, Gabrielle's former mother-in-law. The team eventually determine that the injury was actually caused when Declan, the baby's paternal half-brother, kicked her high chair in frustration and she knocked her head against the wall. Gabrielle is cleared of all charges, Declan is assured that they understand his actions were accidental, and Deborah Vanderhey is basically tried in the court of public opinion. As the team celebrate, Gore Bellows appears to arrest Madeline, having found a lantern that has been identified as the weapon used to kill Rosemary.
12	"In Defense of Madeline Scott, Part 1"	Jennifer Phang	Stacy A. Littlejohn & David Elliot	May 3, 2019	1LBT12	1.57
While the team try to prepare for Madeline's defense, Easy is forced to defend a DREAMer of accusations that he murdered his teacher, but is initially hampered when the victim is threatened with deportation. With unexpected aid from the prosecutor, Easy is able to get the deportation threat overturned, and analysis of the crime scene confirms that the teacher was actually killed by her husband after Brody is able to find a witness that overrules the husband's alibi. Madeline attempts to arrange a defense by using the team's new discovery of a sex cult that Rosemary was a member of, but their case is jeopardized when the two witnesses decline to testify and Bellows reveals that Levi is a witness for the prosecution.
13	"In Defense of Madeline Scott, Part 2"	Howie Deutch	Adam Armus	May 10, 2019	1LBT13	1.66
Madeline realizes Ravi is still alive. Brody is able to find a videotape of Rosemary revealing that Ravi wanted her to drug Madeline on the night of the party, with Rosemary explaining her intention to drug Madeline into unconsciousness so that Ravi couldn't do anything with her. Despite Bellows' attempt to use this discovery as Madeline's motive, the jury finds in favor of Madeline. When Brody finds a police record of Ravi, Madeline recognizes him as Rick Zahn, one of Bellows' campaign backers. After Bellows assures Madeline that he knew nothing of Zahn's true past, he confronts Zahn at a dam near the lake where Rosemary was killed and pushes Zahn over the edge, later claiming that Zahn committed suicide.

== Production ==
=== Development ===
On August 4, 2017, it was announced that Fox had given the production, then titled Infamy, a script plus penalty commitment. The pilot episode was written by David Elliot who is set to executive produce alongside Danny Strong and Stacy Greenberg. Production companies involved with the pilot include Danny Strong Productions and 20th Century Fox Television. On February 1, 2018, it was announced that Fox had given the production a pilot order. On May 9, 2018, it was announced that Fox had given the production, now titled Proven Innocent, a series order. A few days later, it was announced that the series would premiere in the spring of 2019 as a mid-season replacement. On October 29, 2018, it was announced that the series would premiere on February 15, 2019.

=== Casting ===
On February 21, 2018, it was announced that Russell Hornsby had been cast in the pilot's lead male role. In March 2018, it was reported that Rachelle Lefevre, Vincent Kartheiser, Riley Smith, Brian d’Arcy James, Clare O’Connor, and Nikki M. James had joined the main cast as series regulars. On June 1, 2018, it was announced that Kelsey Grammer had been cast to replace d'Arcy James in the role of Gore Bellows (previously Cole Bellows). In September 2018, it was reported that Elaine Hendrix and Laurie Holden had been cast in recurring roles. In October 2018, it was announced that Caitlin Mehner, Tembi Locke, Tiffany Dupont, and Catherine Lidstone had also joined the cast in a recurring capacity. On November 1, 2018, it was reported that Candice Coke had been cast in a recurring role.

=== Filming ===
On January 30, 2019, filming for the series in Chicago, Illinois was shut down due to the 2019 polar vortex.

== Release ==
=== Marketing ===
On May 14, 2018, Fox released the first trailer for the series. On January 16, 2019, another trailer was released.

=== Distribution ===
In Italy, the series is premiere on February 19, 2019, on Fox Crime. In the United Kingdom, the series was scheduled to premiere in March 2019 on Universal TV.

== Reception ==
=== Critical response ===
On the review aggregator website Rotten Tomatoes, the series has an approval rating of 25% based on 16 reviews, with an average rating of 6.12/10. The website's critical consensus reads, "The jury finds Proven Innocent—on the charges of saddling fine actors with clunky dialogue, padding out its storylines with stale plot contrivances, and wasting viewers' time with rote procedural formula—guilty on all counts." Metacritic, which uses a weighted average, assigned a score of 47 out of 100 based on 10 critics, indicating "mixed or average reviews".

=== Ratings ===
Viewership and ratings per episode of Proven Innocent
No.	Title	Air date	Rating/share (18–49)	Viewers (millions)	DVR (18–49)	DVR viewers (millions)	Total (18–49)	Total viewers (millions)
1	"Pilot"	February 15, 2019	0.5/3	3.08	0.4	2.34	0.9	5.42
2	"The Burden of Truth"	February 22, 2019	0.4/2	2.07	0.2	1.62	0.6	3.68
3	"A Minor Confession"	March 1, 2019	0.5/3	2.57	0.3	1.82	0.8	4.39
4	"The Shame Game"	March 8, 2019	0.4/2	1.90	0.3	1.75	0.7	3.65
5	"Cross to Bear"	March 15, 2019	0.4/2	1.97	0.2	1.58	0.6	3.55
6	"A Cinderhella Story"	March 22, 2019	0.4/2	2.33	0.3	1.52	0.7	3.85
7	"Living and Dying in East Cleveland"	March 29, 2019	0.4/2	1.92	0.2	1.53	0.6	3.45
8	"The Struggle for Stonewall"	April 5, 2019	0.4/2	1.70	0.2	1.60	0.6	3.30
9	"Acceptable Losses"	April 12, 2019	0.4/2	1.74	0.2	1.38	0.6	3.12
10	"SEAL Team Deep Six"	April 19, 2019	0.4/2	1.90	0.2	1.36	0.6	3.25
11	"Shaken"	April 26, 2019	0.3/2	1.69	0.3	1.42	0.6	3.11
12	"In Defense of Madeline Scott, Part 1"	May 3, 2019	0.3/2	1.57	0.3	1.27	0.6	2.84
13	"In Defense of Madeline Scott, Part 2"	May 10, 2019	0.4/2	1.66	TBD	TBD	TBD	TBD
