= Coffee Date =

2006 US independent film by Stewart Wade

- Directed by: Stewart Wade
- Written by: Stewart Wade
- Produced by: Cindy Peters
- Starring: Jonathan Bray; Wilson Cruz
- Cinematography: Howard Wexler
- Edited by: David Avallone
- Music by: Eban Schletter; Debbie Gibson
- Distributed by: TLA Releasing (US); Film and Music Entertainment (Worldwide)
- Release date: November 10, 2006
- Running time: 94 minutes
- Country: United States
- Language: English
- Box office: $4,412

Coffee Date is a 2006 independent film written and directed by Stewart Wade and released by BrownBag Productions. Originally a short film by Wade, it was expanded into a feature and played at various film festivals.

The film stars Jonathan Bray, Wilson Cruz, Jonathan Silverman and Sally Kirkland and also features Deborah Gibson, Elaine Hendrix and Leigh Taylor-Young. In addition to acting in the film, Gibson wrote and performed the closing credits song.

== Plot summary ==
Todd arrives at a cafe for a blind date with Kelly, whom he expects to be a girl. When Kelly turns out to be a gay man, Todd discovers that he has been the victim of a prank by his brother Barry. Todd and Kelly decide to get revenge on Barry by pretending they are indeed now a couple. The joke soon goes further than they expected when Todd's family and friends begin to believe he is gay. Despite his repeated attempts to prove otherwise, Todd soon finds himself doubting his own sexuality, and feelings toward Kelly.

== Cast ==
- Jonathan Bray as Todd
- Wilson Cruz as Kelly
- Jonathan Silverman as Barry
- Sally Kirkland as Mrs. Muller
- Elaine Hendrix as Bonnie
- Joanne Baron as Mrs. Orsini
- Deborah Gibson as Melissa
- Leigh Taylor-Young as Diana
- Jason Stuart as Clayton
- Judy Dixon as Ann
- Lisa Ann Walter as Sara
- Margot Boecker as Lisa
- Maggie Wagner as Trudy
- Ian Fisher as Ian
- Kristin Andersen as Mrs. Donovon
- Peter Bedard as Anthony
- Tony Brown as Marco
- Natalia Guslistaya as Christa
- Chris Keslar as Tom
- Eddie Khalil as Goth Guy
- Clytie Lane as Cheryl
- Steve Mastro Jr. as Brent
- Marcus Reynaga as Michael
- Thomas Saunders as Matt
- Spero Stamboulis as Stripper
- Carol Ann Susi as Betty
- Ian Fisher as Ian

== Reception ==
On Rotten Tomatoes the film has an approval rating of 50% based on reviews from 18 critics.

== Awards ==
In 2007, it won the Audience Award as "Best Feature Film" at Sedona International Film Festival
