= Rob Moran =

American actor and producer

- Education: Emerson College
- Occupations: Actor, producer
- Years active: 1986–present
- Spouse: Julie Moran (m. 1987)
- Children: 2

Rob Moran is an actor and producer best known for his roles in Farrelly brothers films.

== Education ==
Moran graduated from Emerson College in 1982.

== Career ==
Moran is noted for roles in multiple films directed by the Farrelly brothers, including Dumb and Dumber, Kingpin, There's Something About Mary, Me, Myself and Irene, Shallow Hal and Hall Pass. Moran also played the Carlin family patriarch in the American teen drama South Of Nowhere, and an ER doctor in Meet Dave. He later appeared as the doomed patriarch in the 2011 horror film You're Next. He has made guest appearances in numerous television series as well. Since 1986, Moran has appeared in over 60 films – both screen and television – and produced a few of them as well.

== Personal life ==
In 1985, Rob and actress Julie Bryan began dating after being paired together on a Ford automotive commercial. They were married in 1987. In 1999, the couple welcomed their eldest daughter. In 2004, their second daughter was born.

== Filmography ==
=== Film ===
Year	Title	Role	Notes
1986	Quiet Cool	Briggs	
1989	The Runnin' Kind	Jerk in Jeep	
1990	Navy SEALs	U.S. Navy Co-Pilot	
1991	Wedlock	Security Guard #1	
1991	Ted & Venus	Patient #2	
1994	The Cowboy Way	Bartender	
1994	Dumb & Dumber	Bartender	
1996	Kingpin	Stanley Osmanski	
1998	There's Something About Mary	Detective Stabler	
1998	Beach Movie	Reporter Brett Bronson	
2000	We Married Margo	Himself	Cameo
2000	Me, Myself & Irene	Trooper Finneran	
2001	Shallow Hal	2nd Hostess Tiffany	
2004	The Almost Guys	Team Security	
2006	Peaceful Warrior	Dan Millman Sr.	
2007	National Lampoon's Bag Boy	Stanley Ormanski	Also producer
2008	Meet Dave	ER Doctor	
2008	Proud American	A.J.	
2009	2:13	Russell's Father	
2009	The Outside	Tim Evans	
2009	The Things We Carry	Steven	
2011	Hall Pass	Ed Long	
2011	You're Next	Paul	
2012	Just an American	A.J.	
2013	Star Trek Into Darkness	U.S.S. Vengeance Ensign	
2014	Heaven Is For Real	Dr. O'Holleran	
2014	Blended	Baseball Dad	
2016	Long Nights Short Mornings	—N/a	Executive producer
2017	Sex.Sound.Silence	Mike Diesel	
2018	Run the Race	Mac Grayson	
2018	Lez Bomb	Ken	Also producer
2018	American Dresser	Brian	Also executive producer
2019	The Legend of 5 Mile Cave	William Davis	
2019	The Devil Has a Name	Wally	
2020	Hooking Up	Charlie	
2020	Arkansas	Business Manager	
2022	One Way	Doctor	
2025	Hunting Seaston	Dale	

=== Television ===
Year	Title	Role	Notes
1988	Police Story: The Watch Commander	Chuck Stone	TV movie
1989	Tour of Duty	Aide	Episode: "For What It's Worth"
1989	Cheers	Dennis Hammill	Episode: "The Two Faces of Norm"
1990	Matlock	Assistant D.A. John	Episode: "The Witness"
1990	FM	Drew	Episode: "No Fool Like an April Fool"
1990	Designing Women	Soldier #1	Episode: "Keep the Homes Fires Burning"
1999	Late Last Night	Director	TV movie
1999, 2001	JAG	Cyrus Fortney / Cop #1	2 episodes
2001	It's Like, You Know...	Slick Guy	Episode: "Walking Tall"
2002–2003	Days of Our Lives	Mayor Arthur Shepard	6 episodes
2003	Knee High P.I.	Policeman	TV movie
2003	The West Wing	Art Hughes	Episode: "Disaster Relief"
2004	Cold Case	Max Tanning	Episode: "Lover's Lane"
2005	CSI: Miami	Walter Rockingham	Episode: "Shootout"
2005	Without a Trace	Scott Mohr	Episode: "Neither Rain Nor Sleet"
2005–2008	South of Nowhere	Arthur Carlin	41 episodes
2006	NUMB3RS	Jon Northrup	Episode: "Dark Matter"
2008	3Way	Brick Schtouse	Uncredited, 3 episodes
2008	According to Jim	Director	Episode: "Two for the Money"
2009	Men of a Certain Age	Harold	Episode: "The New Guy"
2009	United States of Tara	Pastor Hitch Maurio	2 episodes
2012	Hatfields & McCoys	John B. Floyd	2 episodes
2013	The B.S. Club	Peter	
2014	Rake	Slater	Episode: "Remembrance of Taxis Past"
2019	Wedding at Graceland	Tyler	TV movie
