= Caitlin Mehner =

American actress

- Occupation: Actress
- Years active: 2007–present
- Partner(s): Danny Strong (2013–present; engaged)

Caitlin Mehner is an American television and film actress.

== Career ==
Mehner appeared as Honey Bruce in the first series of The Marvelous Mrs. Maisel. In 2018, Mehner was cast in the film Perception, and the lesbian comedy film Lez Bomb. and as a recurring character in Fox legal drama Proven Innocent. In 2019 she could be seen in the civil rights film Best of Enemies.

In 2021, she appeared in the miniseries Dopesick. In 2022 she gained a recurring role in CBS police procedural East New York. In 2023, she could be seen in the television series Chicago PD and Three Women.

She had a role in 2025 action thriller film G20.

== Personal life ==
In 2016 Mehner became engaged to fellow American actor Danny Strong. They live in New York.

== Partial filmography ==
Year	Title	Role	Notes
2017	The Marvelous Mrs. Maisel	Honey Bruce	2 episodes
2018	Lez Bomb	Haley	
2018	Ocean's Eight	Pamela	Film
2018	Bull	Julia Summerfield	1 episode
2019	Beyond the Night	Maisie Marrow	
2019	The Best of Enemies	Maddy Mays	Film
2019	Proven Innocent	Heather Husband	10 episodes
2019	Mob Town	Margie	
2020	Blackjack: The Jackie Ryan Story	Chrissy Ryan	
2021	Dopesick	Paula Greene	2 episodes
2021	NCIS: Hawai'i	Anna Freeloff	1 episode
2022	Barrio Boy	Shelly	
2022–2023	East New York	Connie Moynihan	8 episodes
2023	Chicago PD	Samantha Beck	4 episodes
2023	Three Women	Lizzie	3 episodes
2025	G20	Jennifer	Film
