= Steve Wynn =

American casino mogul and art collector

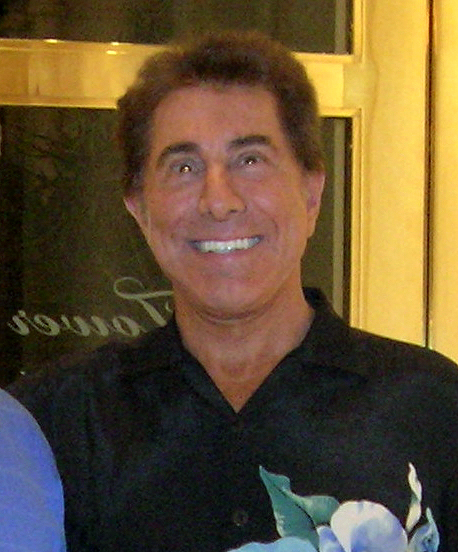
- Wynn in June 2008

Finance Chair of the Republican National Committee
- In office January 30, 2017 – January 27, 2018
- Preceded by: Lew Eisenberg
- Succeeded by: Todd Ricketts

Personal details
- Born: Stephen Alan Weinberg; January 27, 1942 (age 84) New Haven, Connecticut, U.S.
- Spouses: Elaine Wynn (m. 1963; div. 1986) (m. 1991; div. 2010) Andrea Hissom (m. 2011)
- Children: 2
- Education: University of Pennsylvania (BA)
- Occupation: Former CEO of Mirage Resorts (1973–2000); Former CEO of Wynn Resorts (2002–2018); Former Republican National Committee finance chairman (2017–2018)
- Website: steve-wynn.com

Stephen Alan Wynn (né Weinberg; born January 27, 1942) is an American real-estate developer and art collector. He was known for his involvement in the luxury casino and hotel industry, prior to being forced to step down in 2018. Early in his career he oversaw the construction and operation of several Las Vegas and Atlantic City hotels, including the Golden Nugget, the Golden Nugget Atlantic City, The Mirage, Treasure Island, the Bellagio, and Beau Rivage in Mississippi, and he played a pivotal role in the development of the Las Vegas Strip in the 1990s.

In 2000, Wynn sold his company, Mirage Resorts, to MGM Grand Inc., resulting in the formation of MGM Mirage (now MGM Resorts International). Wynn later took his company Wynn Resorts public in an initial public offering and was Wynn Resorts' CEO and Chairman of the Board until February 6, 2018, when he announced his resignation. He is a prominent donor to the Republican Party and was the finance chair of the Republican National Committee from January 2017 to January 2018, when he resigned amid sexual misconduct allegations, which Wynn has denied. On February 6, 2018, Wynn stepped down as CEO of Wynn Resorts.

Through Wynn Resorts, he has overseen the construction and development of several luxury resorts, opening Wynn Las Vegas in 2005, Wynn Macau in 2006, Encore Las Vegas in 2008, Encore at Wynn Macau in 2010 and Wynn Palace in Macau in 2016, and Wynn Everett near Boston which opened in June 2019 under the name Encore Boston Harbor. In 2006, Wynn was inducted into the American Gaming Association Hall of Fame. As of April 2025, Wynn's net worth was estimated by Forbes at $3.7 billion. Steve Wynn collects fine art, including pieces by artists such as Picasso and Claude Monet.

== Early life and education ==
Steve Wynn was born Stephen Alan Weinberg on January 27, 1942, in New Haven, Connecticut, to a Jewish family. His father, Michael, owned a chain of bingo parlors in the eastern United States. His mother Zelma (née Kutner), was from Maine. Wynn’s father changed the family's last name in 1946 from "Weinberg" to "Wynn" when Steve was 4 years old "to avoid anti-Jewish discrimination". Wynn was raised in Utica, New York, and graduated from The Manlius School, a private boys' school east of Syracuse, New York, in 1959.

After high school, Wynn studied English literature at the University of Pennsylvania, where he was a member of the Sigma Alpha Mu fraternity. Wynn graduated in 1963 with a Bachelor of Arts. Shortly before graduation, his father died during heart surgery, leaving $350,000 in gambling debts. Wynn, who had been accepted into Yale Law School, relinquished his admission and instead took over his family's bingo parlor in Waysons Corner, Maryland.

== Career ==
=== Frontier and the Golden Nugget (1967–1989) ===
In 1967, Wynn and his family moved to Las Vegas where he purchased a small stake in the Frontier Hotel and Casino. That year he met E. Parry Thomas, the president of the Bank of Las Vegas, which was the only bank at the time willing to extend loans to Las Vegas casinos, and Thomas helped finance several of Wynn's early land deals.

In 1971, Wynn bought a controlling interest in the Golden Nugget Las Vegas, one of the oldest casinos in the city. His company stake increased so that, in 1973, he became the majority shareholder, and the youngest casino owner in Las Vegas. In 1977 he opened the Golden Nugget's first hotel tower, followed by several others. Frank Sinatra was a periodic headliner at the Golden Nugget, and Wynn has since maintained a relationship with the Sinatra family, even naming a restaurant at Encore "Sinatra". Wynn also orchestrated the 1987 wedding of Demi Moore and Bruce Willis.

In 1980, Wynn began construction on the Golden Nugget Atlantic City in Atlantic City, New Jersey. It was Atlantic City's first and only "locals casino" and the city's sixth casino after the city legalized gambling in 1976. Joel Bergman, who designed Wynn's other resorts, designed the Golden Nugget. Though at its opening it was the second smallest casino in the city, by 1983 it was the city's top earning casino. Wynn sold the Atlantic City Golden Nugget in 1987 for $440 million.

=== The Mirage and Treasure Island (1989–1997) ===
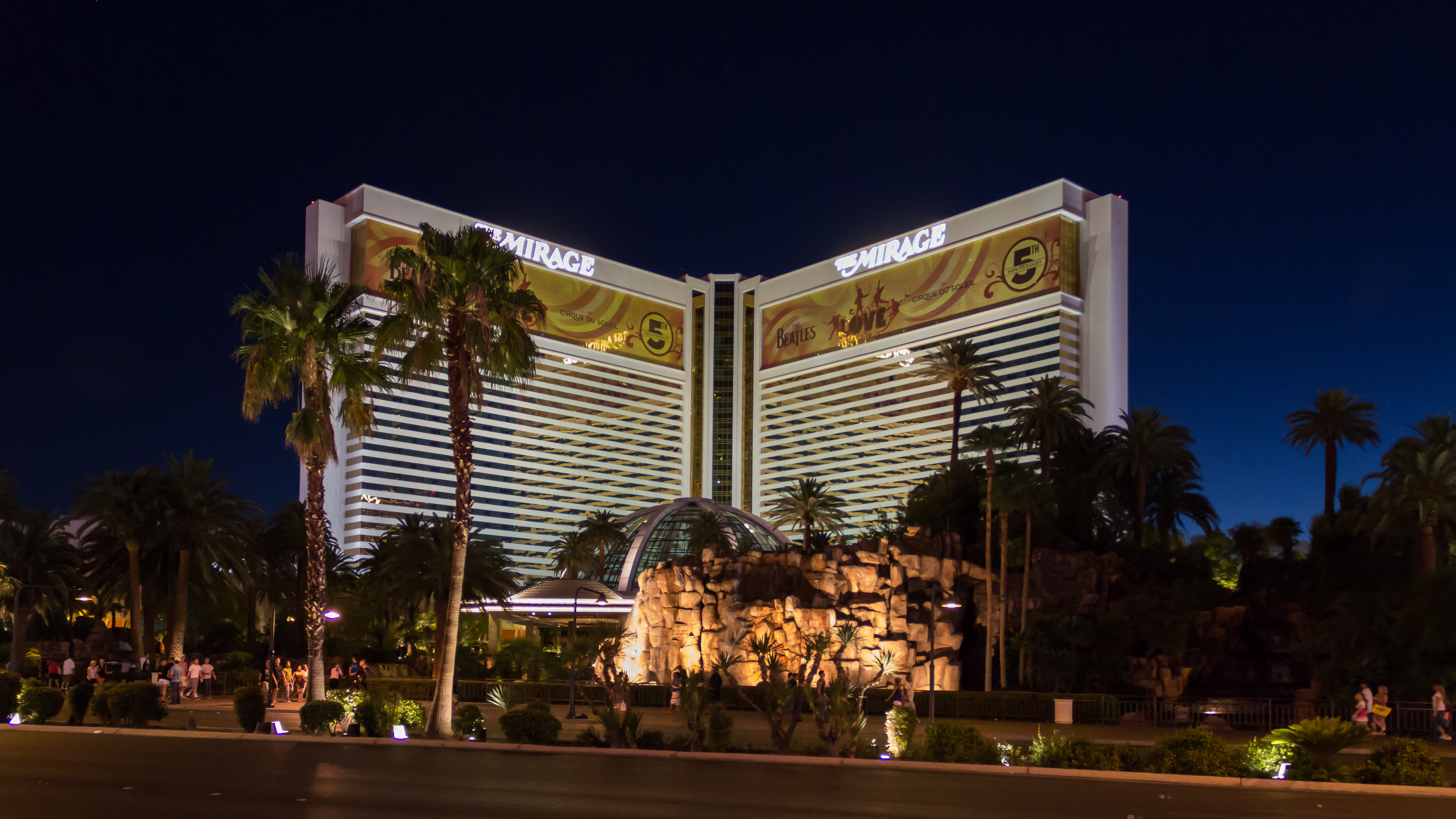
Wynn's first major Las Vegas Strip casino was The Mirage.

Wynn's first major casino on the Las Vegas Strip was The Mirage, which opened on November 22, 1989. It was the first time Wynn was involved with the design and construction of a casino, and he financed the $630 million project largely with high-yield bonds issued by Michael Milken. Its construction is also considered noteworthy in that The Mirage was the first casino to use security cameras full-time on all table games. The hotel became the main venue for the Siegfried & Roy show in 1990, and in 1993 the hotel hosted the Cirque du Soleil show Nouvelle Expérience.

During this period, University of Michigan students Bobby Kotick and Howard Marks sought Wynn's funding for Arktronics, their start-up developing GUI-based integrated software. According to Kotick, he and Marks met Wynn at the Dallas “Cattle Baron’s Ball” in September 1983; Wynn invited them onto his private McDonnell Douglas DC-9 for the flight to Atlantic City and, upon their arrival, wrote a US $300 000 check in the Golden Nugget’s basement office to capitalise their start‑up.

Kotick added that Wynn initially took a “one‑third, one‑third, one‑third” equity split with the two students and told them “contracts schmantracts—you’re family now,” but he declined to invest further after their software venture stalled. Wynn accepted their request, claiming that Thomas had financed his early land deals on the condition that Wynn someday mentor another entrepreneur. Aside from Wynn's $300,000 investment in Arktronics to fund the development of Jane, he later provided funding for a hostile takeover of Activision that ultimately allowed Kotick to become its CEO until Microsoft's 2023 acquisition of Activision Blizzard for $68.7 billion.

Wynn's next project, Treasure Island Hotel and Casino, opened in the Mirage's old parking lot on October 27, 1993, at an overall cost of $450 million. The establishment was the home of the first permanent Cirque du Soleil show in Las Vegas.

In 1995, Wynn's company proposed to build the Le Jardin hotel-casino in the marina area if the state of New Jersey built a road that connected to the hotel-casino. The company had also agreed to allow Circus Circus Enterprises and Boyd Gaming to build casinos on the site but later reneged on the agreement. While the road, called the Atlantic City-Brigantine Connector, was eventually built, Le Jardin was cancelled after the company was acquired in 2000 by MGM Grand Inc., which later built the Borgata, in a joint venture with Boyd Gaming, on the site.

=== Bellagio and Beau Rivage debuts (1998–1999) ===
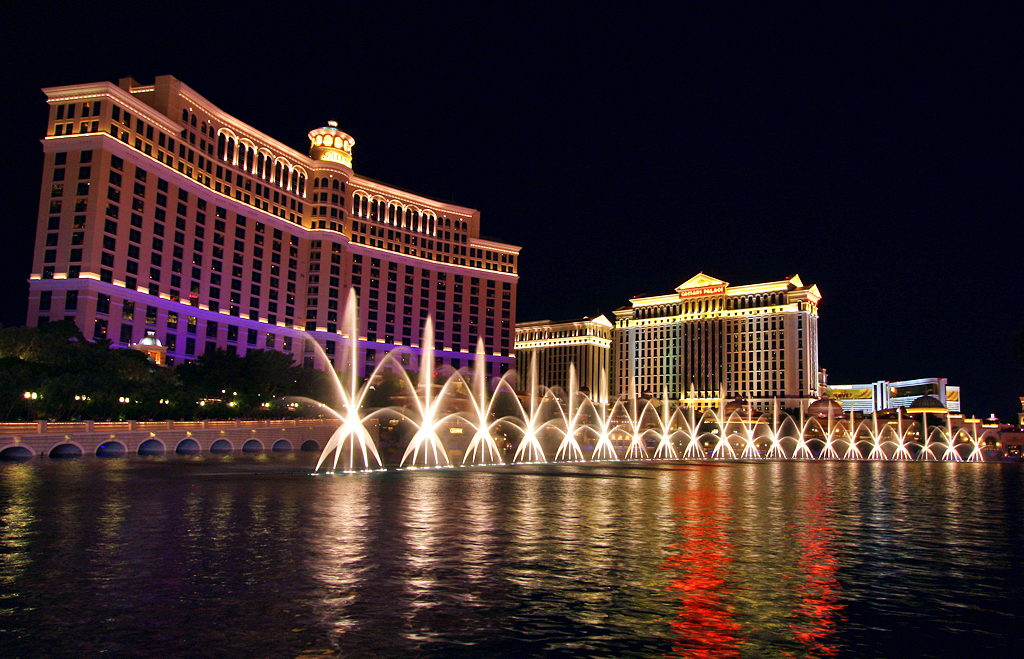
Wynn's company Mirage Resorts oversaw the construction of the Bellagio, which at the time was the most expensive hotel in the world.

On October 15, 1998, Wynn opened the even more opulent Bellagio, a $1.6 billion resort considered among the world's most spectacular hotels. The architect was Jon Jerde of The Jerde Partnerships, and construction was undertaken by Wynn's company Mirage Resorts, Inc. When built, the Bellagio was the most expensive hotel in the world. In front of the hotel are the Fountains of Bellagio—shooting fountains choreographed to music that "dance" on the hotel's 8.5-acre man-made lake—which are now considered Las Vegas landmarks. The Bellagio is credited with starting a new spree of luxurious developments in Las Vegas. Among these developments include The Venetian, Mandalay Bay, and Paris Las Vegas.

Wynn brought Mirage Resorts' style to Biloxi, Mississippi, in 1999, where he oversaw development of the 1,835-room Beau Rivage. Themed to blend Mediterranean beauty with Southern hospitality, the resort was part of a building boom that established Biloxi as a regional tourism center along the Mississippi Gulf Coast. Beau Rivage was originally the name Wynn wanted to give the Bellagio, though he had decided on Bellagio after vacationing in the Italian region of the same name. Beau Rivage opened as the largest hotel-casino to be built outside Nevada. The casino was initially located on a series of floating barges, as local law confined all casinos to mobile marine vessels at the time. The hotel, restaurants, and associated facilities were constructed on land.

=== Wynn Las Vegas and Macau (2000–2007) ===
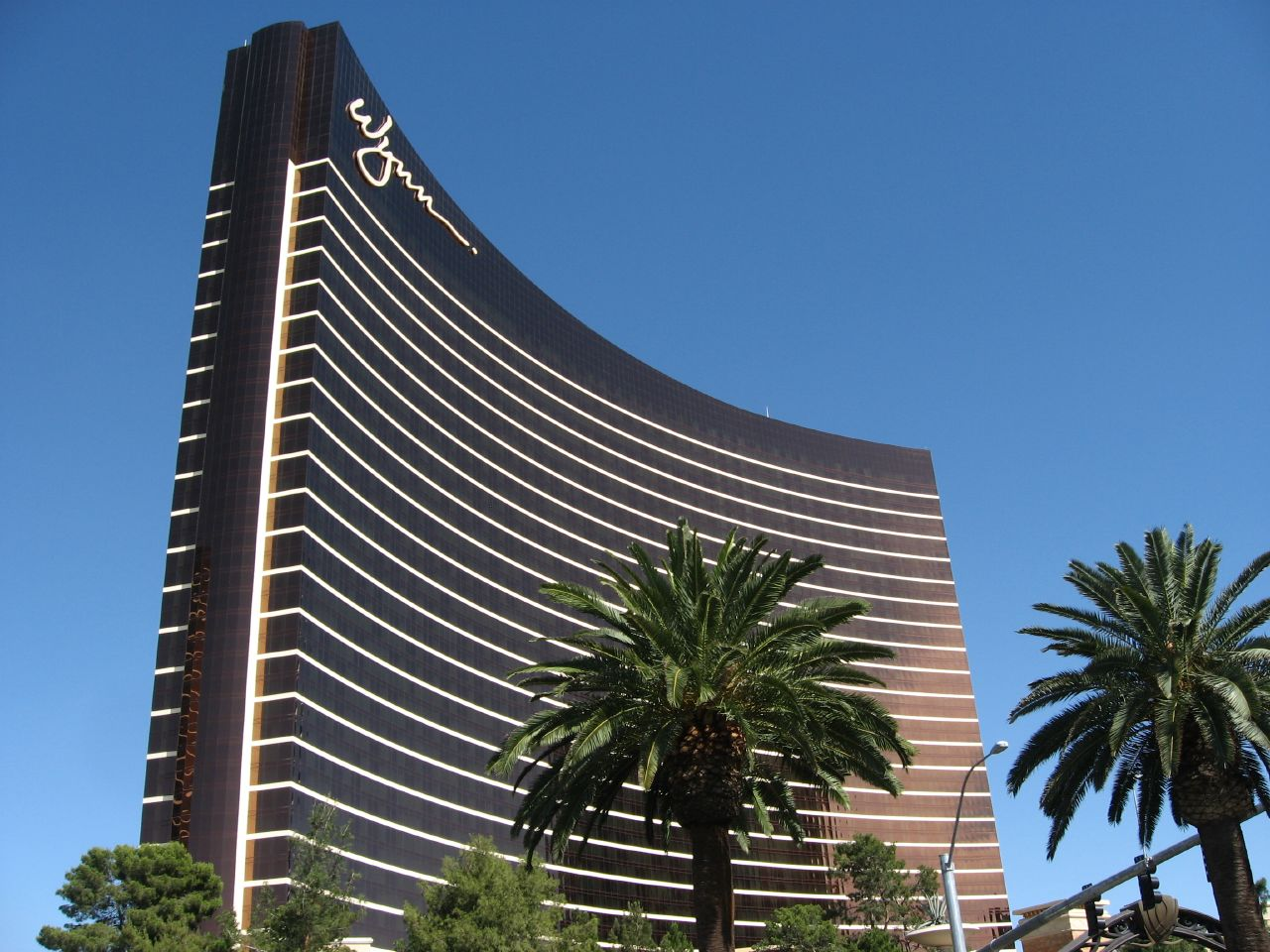
Wynn Las Vegas

Mirage Resorts was sold to MGM Grand Inc., owned by billionaire Kirk Kerkorian, for $6.6 billion ($21 per share) in June 2000 to form MGM Mirage. Five weeks before the deal was closed (April 27, 2000) Wynn purchased the Desert Inn for $270 million. He closed Desert Inn later that year.

Wynn took Wynn Resorts Limited public in 2002. Wynn became a billionaire in 2004, when his net worth doubled to $1.3 billion. On April 28, 2005, he opened his most expensive resort at the time, the Wynn Las Vegas, on the site of the former Desert Inn. Built at a cost of $2.7 billion, it was the largest privately funded construction project in the nation as of 2005.

Wynn successfully bid for one of three gaming concessions opened for tender in Macau. This property, known as Wynn Macau, opened on September 5, 2006.

=== Encore hotels and other projects (2008–2018) ===
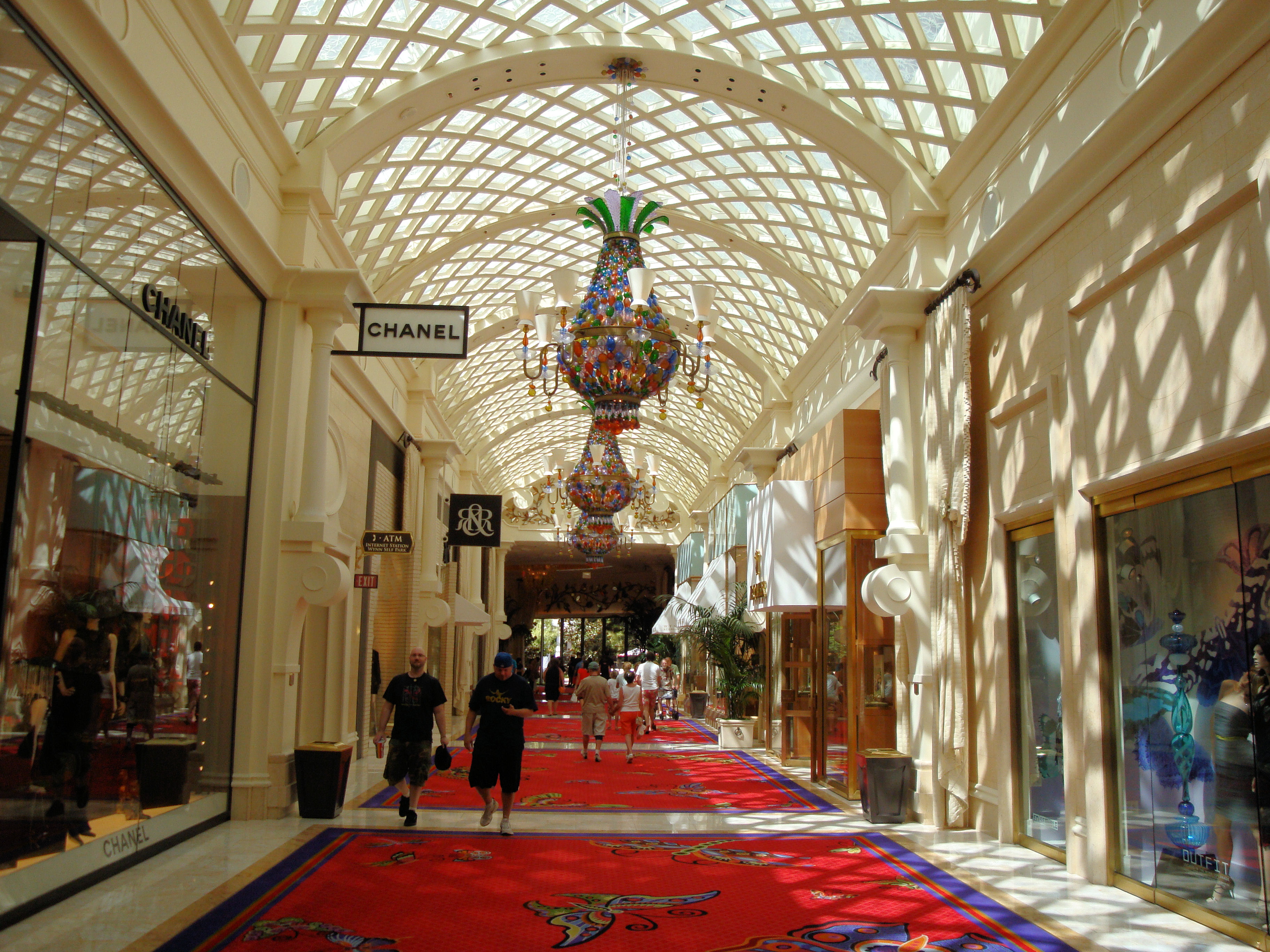
The Encore Hotel in Las Vegas, showing the "esplanade" shops inside the buildings.

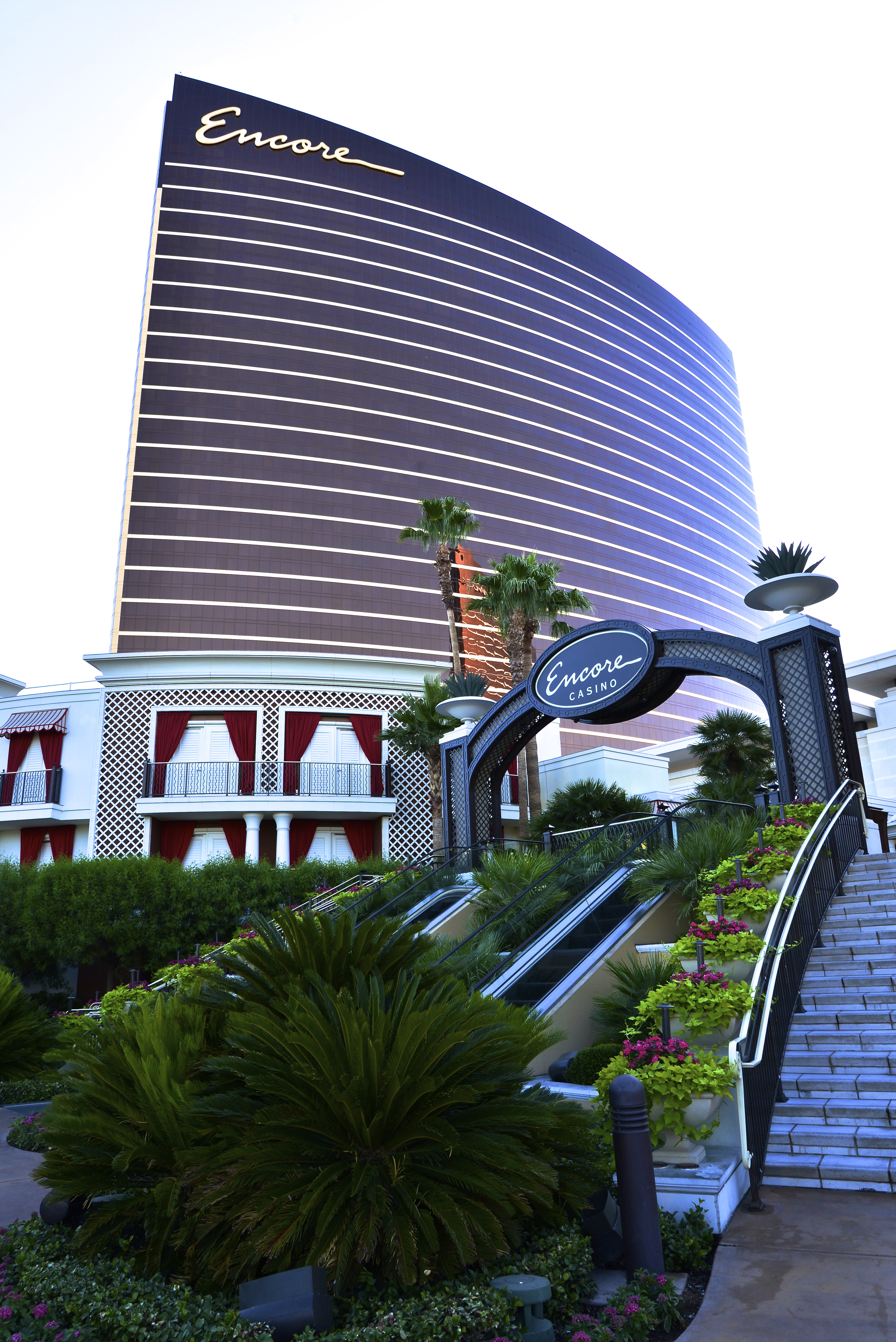
Encore Las Vegas (pictured) was opened in 2008 on the same property as Wynn Las Vegas, though they are separate hotels and casinos.

In the summer of 2008, hiring began for Encore Las Vegas, the newest in Wynn's collection of resorts. The tower of Encore is modeled after the Wynn Las Vegas tower, and they share the same "property" though they are separate hotels. After having started construction in 2006, the overall cost of the project equaled $2.3 billion. Encore opened on December 22, 2008. As of December 31, 2012, Wynn and Encore Las Vegas employed approximately 9,000 full-time employees. Encore at Wynn Macau, an expansion of Wynn Macau similar to the expansion of the Las Vegas property, opened on April 21, 2010.

In 2016, Wynn opened the Wynn Palace in Cotai, Macao, PRC. It was previously approved by the Macau government in 2012.

In September 2014, Wynn was awarded the license to build the Encore Boston Harbor casino (originally to be named Wynn Boston Harbor) in the eastern Massachusetts city of Everett, near downtown Boston.

In 2018, The Wall Street Journal reported that some people recounted a pattern of sexual misconduct by Wynn, including several former employees. On February 6, 2018, Wynn stepped down as CEO of Wynn Resorts, though he denied all allegations.

== Political activities ==
In the past, Wynn has financially supported both Democratic and Republican Party efforts. In 2011 he spoke in support of Nevada Senator Harry Reid. Wynn supported Barack Obama in the 2008 election.

In December 2010, Prince Albert II of Monaco bestowed Monegasque citizenship to Wynn, an unusual act since Wynn did not meet the prerequisites. According to the Las Vegas Sun, Wynn was given citizenship when he agreed to be an outside director in Monaco QD International Hotels and Resorts Management, which is a joint venture between the governments of Monaco and Qatar. The organization buys and manages hotels in Europe, the Middle East and North America.

Between 2012 and 2018, Wynn contributed more than $2.5 million to the Republican Governors Association and also donated $411,000 to the National Republican Senatorial Committee, $248,000 to the Republican National Committee, and $100,000 to the National Republican Congressional Committee. In 2016, Wynn donated $833,000 to Republican Party joint fundraising committees. After Donald Trump won the 2016 U.S. presidential election, Wynn was named a vice-chairman of Trump's inauguration committee.

After the January 2017 inauguration of Donald Trump, Wynn was named finance chairman of the Republican National Committee. In October 2017 The Wall Street Journal reported that Wynn, who has financial interests in China, lobbied President Trump on behalf of the Chinese government to return a Chinese whistleblower, Guo Wengui, to China. On January 28, 2018, Wynn resigned from the finance chairman position amid sexual misconduct allegations. In May 2021, the Department of Justice ordered Wynn to register as a foreign agent of China, and filed a civil lawsuit. He denied acting as a foreign agent and lobbying on China's behalf. The case was dismissed in October 2022.

Together with his spouse, Wynn contributed $1.5 million to Donald Trump's 2020 presidential campaign.

As of August 2026, Wynn and his wife Andrea spent $13.6 million in support of Republican candidates in the 2026 United States elections.

== Art collecting ==
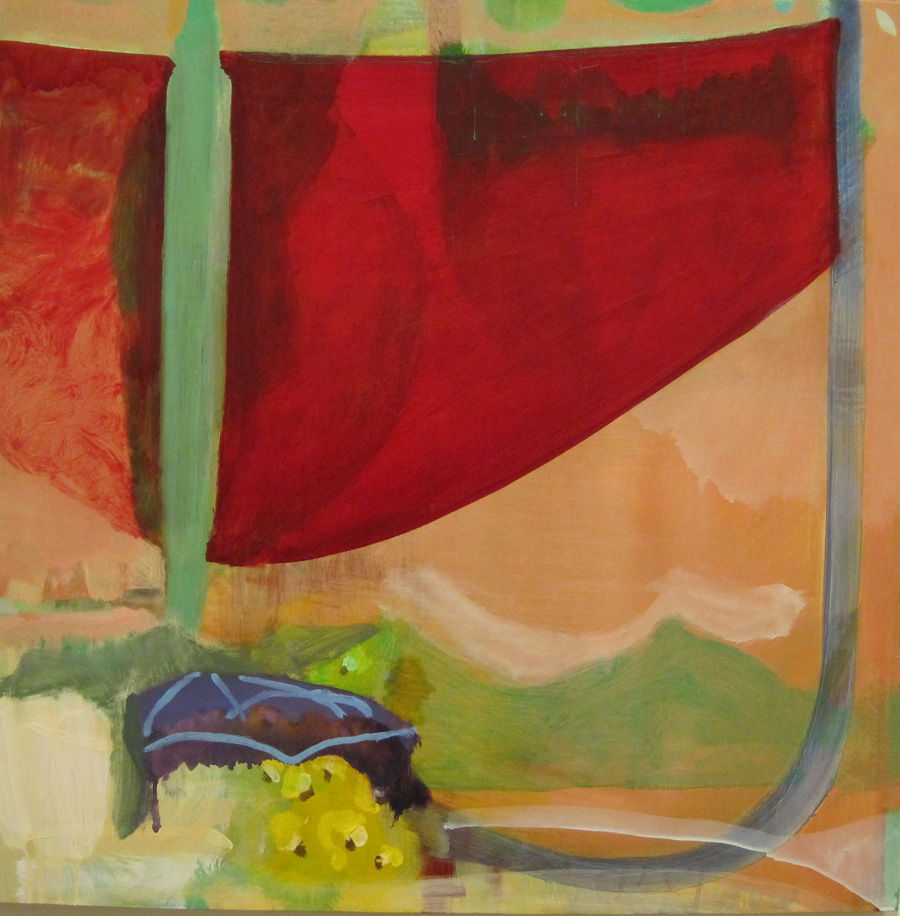
Wynn is a collector of fine art and has bought numerous works by artists such as Paul Cézanne, Paul Gauguin, Vincent van Gogh, Julian Hatton, Édouard Manet, Henri Matisse, Pablo Picasso, Andy Warhol, and Johannes Vermeer. Close to the Wizard of Oz by Julian Hatton.

Wynn is known for amassing a large collection of fine art, often placing the pieces in his various casinos and hotels. In 2004, Wynn purchased Vermeer's A Young Woman Seated at the Virginals at a Sotheby's auction for $30 million. With the purchase, he became the first art collector to purchase a Vermeer painting in over 80 years. Wynn later sold the painting to the Leiden Collection owned by Thomas Kaplan for the same price.

In 2006, Wynn acquired J. M. W. Turner's Giudecca, La Donna Della Salute and San Giorgio for $35.8 million via an anonymous telephone auction. Although Wynn did not officially identify himself as the buyer, his identity was confirmed by two people acquainted with the transaction. Wynn purchased the painting from the St. Francis of Assisi Foundation, a White Plains-based nonprofit organization that supports Capuchin priests on their missionary trips.

Steve Wynn's private art collection with specific commentary about his paintings by Claude Monet are highlighted in the 2008 film Monet's Palate with Meryl Streep and distributed by American Public Television. The collection was on display at the Nevada Museum of Art in Reno while the Wynn Las Vegas was being constructed and was installed in the resort shortly before it was opened. The Wynn Las Vegas gallery, which had charged an entrance fee, closed shortly after the start of 2006.

In 2009, he spent $33.2 million on Rembrandt's Man with His Arms Akimbo, the auction record for the artist.

Under the direction of Steve Wynn, Wynn Resorts acquired Jeff Koons's Tulips at auction in November 2012 for approximately $33.6 million. In May 2014, Wynn acquired Popeye, also by Koons, for over $28.165 million.

In February 2020, Wynn bought two Picasso paintings from Donald Marron's collection for $105 million: Woman with Beret and Collar and Jacqueline.

Le Rêve is the Picasso portrait that was the working name of Wynn's resort project. Wynn purchased the painting from an anonymous collector in a private sale in 2001. In 2006, he reportedly planned to sell the work to Steven A. Cohen for $139 million, which would at that time have been the highest price paid for any piece of art. However, Wynn put his elbow through the canvas while showing it to a group of guests. This canceled the sale, and after a $90,000 repair, the painting was estimated to be worth $85 million. Wynn sued his insurance company over the $54 million difference with the virtual selling price. The case was settled out of court in April 2007. In 2013, Wynn sold Le Rêve to Steven A. Cohen for $155 million.

== Personal life ==
Wynn married Elaine Farrell Pascal in 1963. They divorced in 1986, remarried in 1991, and divorced again in 2010. Elaine Wynn was a director of the company's board for 13 years, ending in 2015. They have two daughters. One of them, Kevyn, was kidnapped in 1993 and Wynn paid $1.45 million in ransom for her return. The kidnappers were apprehended when one attempted to use a large sum of cash to buy a Ferrari in Newport Beach, California. Kevyn was found unharmed several hours later.

On April 30, 2011, Wynn married Andrea Hissom, great-niece of Ben Novack, in a ceremony at the Wynn Las Vegas. Actor Clint Eastwood served as the best man.

Wynn suffers from the degenerative eye disease retinitis pigmentosa, which he was diagnosed with in 1971. In 2010, Wynn switched to a plant-based diet after watching the documentary Eating by Mike Anderson.

== Honors and recognition ==
In May 2006, Time magazine included Wynn as one of the World's 100 Most Influential People. Wynn was appointed to the Board of Trustees of the John F. Kennedy Center for the Performing Arts by President George W. Bush on October 30, 2006. In November 2006, Wynn was inducted into the American Gaming Association Hall of Fame. Forbes magazine named him to a list of "captains of capitalism" in 2007 alongside others included such as Oprah Winfrey and Jeff Bezos. Wynn was named to Institutional Investor's Best CEOs list in the All-America Executive Team Survey from 2008 through 2011.

In March 2011, Barron's named Steve Wynn one of the 30 "World's Best CEOs."

In November 2014, Wynn ranked 17th on Harvard Business Review's list of 100 best-performing CEOs in the world.

He also received an honorary doctorate degree from the University of Pennsylvania in 2006, which was rescinded following Wynn's sexual misconduct allegations in 2018.

== Legal issues ==
In 1991, Dennis Gomes, president of Wynn's Golden Nugget, left his position to join Donald Trump's Trump Taj Mahal in Atlantic City, receiving a $1 million bonus in lieu of equity. Wynn filed suit against Trump and Gomes for breach of contract, as Gomes was contracted to work at the Nugget until 1992. Gomes settled in 1994.

In 1997, Wynn sued Barricade Books for defamation over the catalog description of an unauthorized biography Running Scared by John L. Smith. Wynn was initially awarded $3.2 million, resulting in Barricade declaring bankruptcy. In 2001 the ruling was thrown out by the Supreme Court of Nevada. A retrial was scheduled for 2004. The issue was settled between Wynn and New York publisher Lyle Stuart in a confidential agreement, and the case dismissed.

In a legal battle over an attempt by Wynn-controlled Mirage to build a casino in Atlantic City, Donald Trump claimed in a lawsuit that Wynn used a private investigator as a double agent to secretly record conversations with Trump. The investigator, Louis Rodriguez, a former Los Angeles police officer and investigator for the IRS, claimed he had a change of heart because he felt that Trump used his efforts "in an immoral and unethical manner to cause financial harm" to Wynn and Mirage and thus turned "whistleblower." Wynn settled the lawsuit in 2000 and befriended Trump, who attended Wynn's wedding in 2011.

Beginning in 2008, Wynn engaged in a dispute with Girls Gone Wild producer Joe Francis. In 2011, a Nevada district attorney prosecuted Francis for writing a bad check to cover a $2 million gambling debt owed to Wynn, but the judge dismissed the case for falling outside the six-month statute of limitations. Wynn collected the debt in a separate civil case. In response to the collection, Francis alleged that Wynn threatened to kill him, prompting Wynn to file suit for defamation against Francis. In February 2012, Clark County, Nevada, judge Mark Denton ruled that Francis damaged the reputation of Wynn with the false claim and awarded Wynn $7.5 million in damages. In September 2012, after Francis repeated the alleged threat on television, Wynn added a second defamation claim, and a jury awarded Wynn $40 million in compensatory as well as punitive damages.

In January 2012, Wynn's former business partner Kazuo Okada filed suit to gain access to company documents related to Wynn's pledge to donate $135 million to the University of Macau Development Foundation. Wynn later accused Okada's company, Aruze, of violating the Foreign Corrupt Practices Act, leading to a Department of Justice probe into Aruze's gifts of hotel rooms and other expenses to Philippine, South Korean, and Japanese gaming officials. In a March 2013 U.S. Securities and Exchange Commission (SEC) filing, Wynn noted that while the Okada dispute could cut into Wynn's profits, beyond an "informal" SEC inquiry into the Macau donation, there was no formal investigation underway. In July 2013, the SEC announced that its investigation into the Macau donations was concluded and it would not pursue any enforcement action against Wynn or Wynn Resorts.

In 2014, Wynn sued hedge fund manager James Chanos for slander after Chanos, at a Berkeley event, allegedly said Wynn violated the Foreign Corrupt Practices Act. Wynn's lawsuit was dismissed, with U.S. District Judge William Orrick III ruling that Chanos's remark was constitutionally protected speech. Wynn was also ordered to pay Chanos' legal fees. Wynn's subsequent appeal was rejected by the U.S. Court of Appeals for the Ninth Circuit.

In March 2024, Wynn filed a petition asking the Supreme Court to overturn New York Times v. Sullivan, which on First Amendment freedom of speech grounds, limits the ability of a public official to sue for defamation.

=== 2018 Wynn Resorts departure ===
Wynn has dealt with several legal issues related to sexual misconduct allegations that were covered by The Wall Street Journal in 2018. One accusation came from a manicurist whom Wynn later paid a $7.5 million settlement. In February 2018, Nevada regulators fined Wynn's company $20 million for failing to respond to sexual misconduct claims. In April 2019, the Massachusetts Gaming Commission fined Wynn Resorts $35 million due to the gaming authority's findings that former company executives did not disclose sexual misconduct allegations against Steve Wynn.

Angelica Limcaco, a former salon manager at Wynn Las Vegas, filed a federal lawsuit in 2018 against Wynn Resorts and Steve Wynn claiming that she was fired, blacklisted and intimidated into silence after she elevated her concerns in 2006 to then-president of Wynn Las Vegas, Andrew Pascal. The case was appealed to the 9th U.S. Circuit Court of Appeals after Judge Miranda Du ruled in favor of Wynn Las Vegas, holding that the claim was not made within the statute of limitations. Angelica Limcaco's attorney, Jordan Matthews, argued that the time limits should not apply because Limcaco feared for her personal safety. Jordan Matthews filed a petition with the Ninth Circuit in March 2020 questioning the Nevada District Court's selection of Elayna Youchah as a magistrate judge. Elayna Youchah was Wynn Las Vegas' lead counsel in the Limcaco case and Youchah was apparently selected just before Judge Du dismissed Limcaco's case. Matthews argued there was no disclosure about this apparent conflict of interest. In May 2020, Judges William A. Fletcher, Jay S. Bybee and Paul J. Watford, heard oral argument on the Limcaco case in San Francisco, California. Jordan Matthews argued that the lower court's decision should be reversed. The Massachusetts Gaming Commission Report confirmed that Wynn Las Vegas and Steve Wynn took steps to remove a rape victim immediately after Limcaco reported the rape and Limcaco was then threatened by her superior, Doreen Whennen, to remain silent.

In March 2018, lawyer Lisa Bloom announced that she would represent a former dancer in a sexual misconduct suit against Wynn. In response, Wynn filed a defamation lawsuit against Bloom, pointing out that he is legally blind and could not "leer" at dancers. In April 2018, Wynn filed a defamation lawsuit against his former employee Jorgen Nielsen after he made negative comments about Wynn's alleged sexual misconduct to The Wall Street Journal and ABC news. In October 2019, Neilsen filed a lawsuit against Wynn Resorts, its CEO, Matthew Maddox, its former general counsel, Kim Sinatra, and Wynn Resorts former head of security, James Stern, for allegedly spying on him. In April 2019, James Stern, a former FBI agent and the former executive vice president of corporate security for Wynn Resorts, resigned after testifying before the Massachusetts Gaming Commission to spying on Elaine Wynn and other employees. According to court documents filed by Wynn's lawyers in 2018, Wynn had reached a settlement in 2006 with another former Wynn employee who had accused him of sexual misconduct. The settlement included a non-disclosure agreement. After the Wall Street Journal article came out, the woman announced to Wynn's lawyer that she intended to speak publicly about the settlement, and the lawyer reported her to the FBI for extortion; no charges were filed.

In 2020, a Nevada judge ruled that a woman defamed Wynn when she reported in 2018 that he had raped her in the 1970s, noting that her testimony lacked veracity.

In July 2020, a federal judge dismissed a lawsuit without prejudice against Wynn Resorts, Ltd., which was filed by nine anonymous employees. The federal judge said the women could not justify why it was necessary to file the lawsuit anonymously. Since Judge James C. Mahan dismissed the case without prejudice, the lawsuit can be refiled.
