= Mackenzie Rosman =

American actress (born 1989)

- Born: December 28, 1989 (age 36)
- Occupation: Actress
- Years active: 1995–2015; 2021–present
- Children: 1
- Website: mackrosman.net

Mackenzie Rosman (born December 28, 1989) is an American actress. She is known for her television role as Ruthie Camden on The WB's long-running drama series 7th Heaven.

== Career ==
In 1996, Rosman was cast in the role of Ruthie Camden on 7th Heaven after personally greeting each person in the room with a handshake during her audition. In addition to her role on 7th Heaven, Rosman appeared in the independent film Gideon, starring Christopher Lambert, Charlton Heston and Shelley Winters. She has appeared in numerous television commercials starting at age four including a Tuff's Diaper commercial and a Nike shoe commercial.

Rosman played the role of Loreli in the 2009 film The Tomb, loosely based on "Ligeia" by Edgar Allan Poe, alongside Wes Bentley and Kaitlin Doubleday. She also played Jill in the 2008 horror film, Fading of the Cries.

Rosman appeared in four episodes of Brenda Hampton's teen drama The Secret Life of the American Teenager playing Zoe, a student at Grant High School who sleeps with Ricky Underwood to get back at Adrian Lee for having sex with Zoe's boyfriend Mac. In 2013, she co-starred in the 2013 horror film Beneath, and in the 2013 television film Ghost Shark. Rosman posed for Maxim magazine in September 2013.

In April 2024, it was announced that Rosman would co-host along with her former co-stars, Beverley Mitchell and David Gallagher, a 7th Heaven rewatch podcast, Catching up with the Camdens!

== Personal life ==
Outside of acting, Rosman enjoys spending time with animals. She owns many horses and is a competitive equestrian show jumper and rides her horse Mentos Junior in jumping competitions.

Rosman is an active supporter of fundraising for the Cystic Fibrosis Foundation and wishes to educate the public about the need for organ donation. Mackenzie's stepsister, Katelyn Salmont, lived with cystic fibrosis and underwent a successful double lung transplant in late 2005, her father Randy donating one organ. Both girls were featured in Teen People's "20 Teens Who Will Change the World". 7th Heaven produced a special episode about cystic fibrosis titled "Back in the Saddle" which featured Salmont as herself, and Rosman and Salmont rode horses together, as they did at home. In 2005, Salmont reappeared, post-transplant, on 7th Heaven (the episode entitled "X-Mas"), to describe the new life she'd been given. Salmont died of pneumonia and cystic fibrosis on Christmas 2008. Rosman also supports Childhelp Inc. and is an ambassador for the organization, which helps severely abused children. Rosman is also the national honorary chairman for CureFinders, a school fundraising program to help fund the search for a cure for cystic fibrosis.

Rosman graduated from Valencia High School in late May 2007.

In 2022, Rosman gave birth to her daughter, Ophelia Katelyn. As of early 2017 she resides on a farm in Baltimore County, Maryland, where she is raising her daughter.

== Filmography ==
=== Film ===
Year	Title	Role	Notes
1998	Gideon	Molly MacLemore	
2008	Proud American	Bree	
2009	The Tomb	Loreli	
2011	Fading of the Cries	Jill	
2013	Nightcomer	Rowena Hambleton	
2013	Beneath	Deb	

=== Television ===
Year	Title	Role	Notes
1996–2007	7th Heaven	Ruthie Camden	Main role
2010–2011	The Secret Life of the American Teenager	Zoe	4 episodes
2013	Ghost Shark	Ava Reid	TV movie

== Awards and nominations ==
Year	Award	Category	Work	Result	Refs
1997	Young Artist Awards	Best Performance in a TV Comedy/Drama – Supporting Young Actress Age Ten or Under	7th Heaven	Nominated	
1998	Young Artist Awards	Best Performance in a TV Drama Series – Supporting Young Actress	7th Heaven	Nominated	
1999	Young Artist Awards	Best Performance in a TV Series – Young Ensemble (with Beverley Mitchell, Barry Watson, Jessica Biel and David Gallagher)	7th Heaven	Nominated	
2002	Young Artist Awards	Best Performance in a TV Drama Series – Supporting Young Actress	7th Heaven	Nominated	
2004	Young Artist Awards	Best Performance in a TV Drama Series – Supporting Young Actress	7th Heaven	Won	
2007	Young Artist Awards	Best Performance in a TV Drama Series – Supporting Young Actress	7th Heaven	Nominated	
