= Stewart Wade =

American film director

- Born: United States
- Occupation(s): Screenwriter, film director, film producer

Stewart Wade is the screenwriter, producer and director of several independent short and feature films. Coffee Date was released in 2006, and deals with the intersection of the gay and straight worlds. Tru Loved was released in 2008, and deals with the founding of a school's first gay-straight alliance.
