= Elaine Hendrix =

American actress (born 1970)

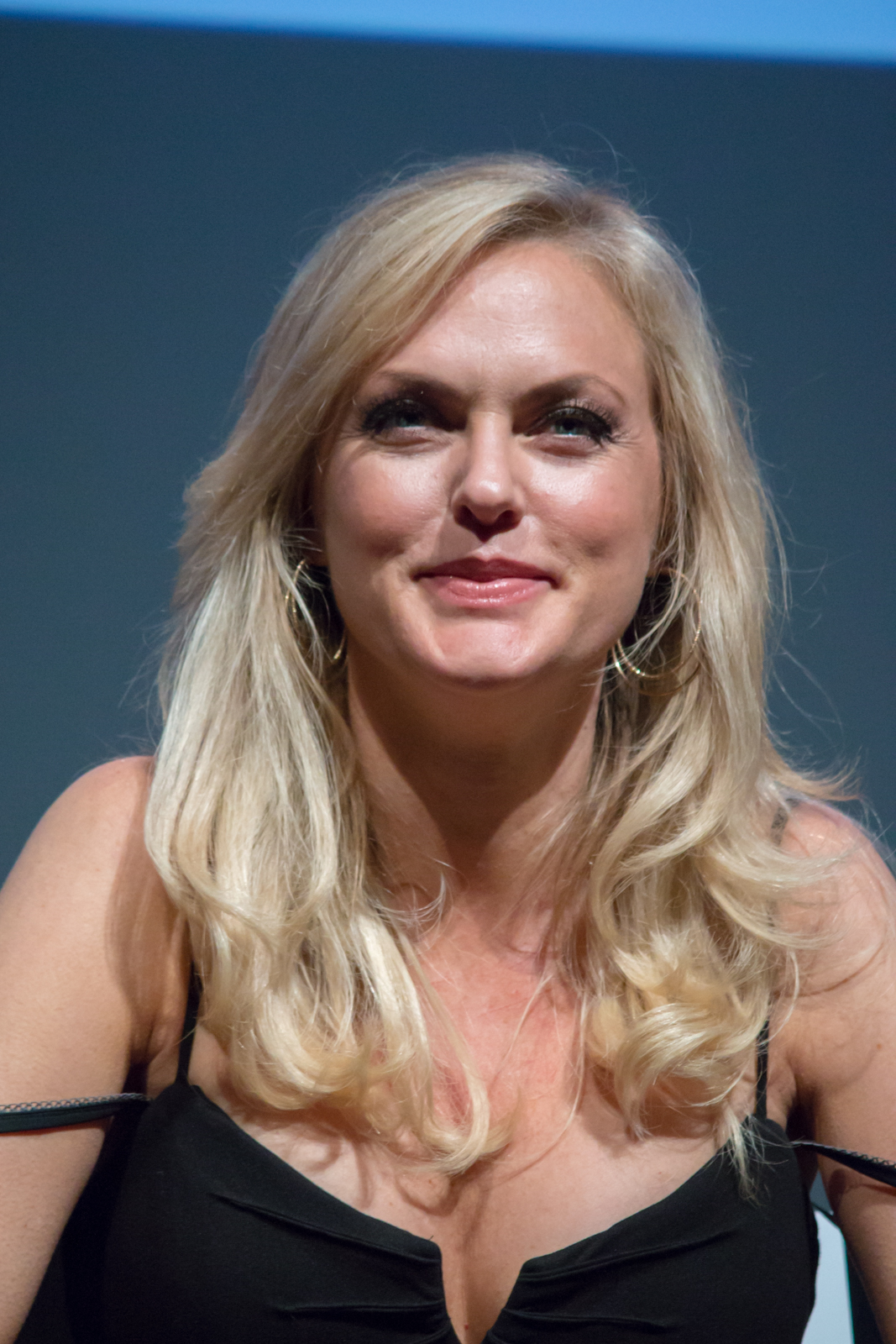
- Hendrix at the 2015 ATX Television Festival
- Born: Katherine Elaine Hendrix; December 28, 1970 (age 55); Oak Ridge, Tennessee, U.S.
- Occupation: Actress
- Years active: 1992–present
- Relatives: Harrison Smith (cousin)
- Website: elainehendrix.com

Katherine Elaine Hendrix (born December 28, 1970) is an American actress. She gained recognition for appearing in a range of television films in the 1990s before her breakthrough role as Meredith Blake in the romantic comedy film The Parent Trap (1998). On television, Hendrix appeared in Joan of Arcadia (2003–2005), 90210 (2010–2011), Anger Management (2014), Sex & Drugs & Rock & Roll (2015–2016), and later gained renewed attention for starring as Alexis Colby in the CW drama television series Dynasty (2019–2022).

== Early life ==
Hendrix was born and raised in Oak Ridge, Tennessee. Her father was serving in the Vietnam War at the time of her birth. Her mother named her Katherine Elaine, but most of her relatives called her by her middle name, and the practice stuck.

== Career ==
=== Dancing and modeling ===
In her senior year of high school, Hendrix won a model search and became a professional dancer with the Gary Harrison Dance Company. She soon split her time as a professional model and dancer for such companies as Nike, Levi's, Mattel, and Sun Microsystems, and for a number of hip-hop artists including Whodini, Keith Sweat and MC Hammer.

In 1992, she moved to Los Angeles, California, and, shortly after, was hit by a car while riding her bike, ending her early career as a model and dancer.

=== Film and television ===
After recuperating from her accident, Hendrix was cast in the short-lived 1995 Get Smart series. She has also appeared on the television series Joan of Arcadia, Friends, Ellen, Charmed and CSI: Crime Scene Investigation and had a recurring role in Married... with Children, User Friendly (1995) and Lez Be Friends (1997).

Films in which she appeared include Romy and Michele's High School Reunion, the 1998 remake of The Parent Trap, Superstar, Inspector Gadget 2, and What the Bleep Do We Know!?. In 2006, she also appeared in an episode of Ghost Whisperer and the movie Coffee Date. In 2018, Hendrix appeared in Christmas at Pemberley Manor, a Hallmark Channel feature TV movie.

In 2008 Hendrix appeared in two episodes of the single-season ABC Family show The Middleman as Roxy Wasserman, a succubus who works as a fashion designer. She was seen in a 2008 episode of Criminal Minds ("Normal"). In 2009 Hendrix made an appearance on the ABC show Castle and in the film Rock Slyde.

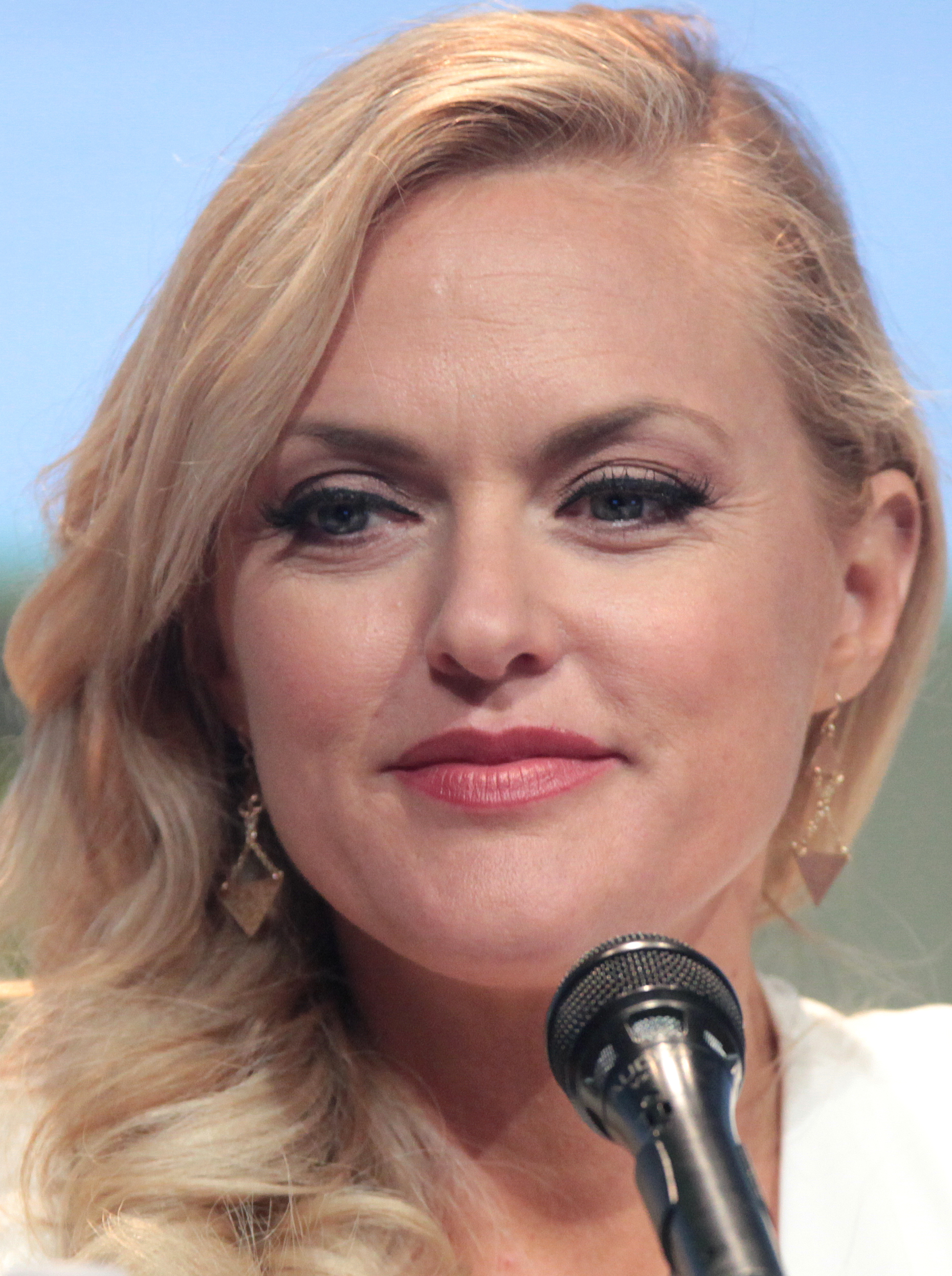
Hendrix at the 2015 San Diego Comic-Con

In 2011, Hendrix played Felicia in the Tribeca award-winning film Spork.

Hendrix has also appeared as Renee on 90210 in season three in "They're Playing Her Song" and "Holiday Madness". In 2014, she appeared alongside Charlie Sheen for a three-episode story arc as Warden Hartley in the FX sitcom Anger Management. She appears in the web-series Fetching, which is also a nod to her love of animals.

She also co-starred as Ava in the FX comedy series Sex & Drugs & Rock & Roll with Denis Leary, Elizabeth Gillies, John Corbett, Bobby Kelly and John Ales.

On September 13, 2018, it was announced that Hendrix would appear as the recurring character Susan Andrews in the Fox series Proven Innocent.

In October 2019, Hendrix was cast as Alexis Carrington Colby for season three of The CW's Dynasty reboot series, replacing Nicollette Sheridan who left the role for personal family reasons.

She reunited with Parent Trap co-star Lindsay Lohan in the 2025 American fantasy comedy film Freakier Friday in a cameo role as Blake Kale. Of her reunion with Lohan, Hendrix told Entertainment Weekly, "I got to physically see her, and we spent a lot of time together on set, hanging out, reminiscing, and catching up. Now, we're better about staying in touch with one another".

In 2025, Hendrix was announced to be competing on season 34 of Dancing with the Stars. She was partnered with Alan Bersten and placed fifth in the season finale.

== Stage ==
Hendrix starred as Lisa in the cast of the Off-Broadway play It's Just Sex at the Actors Temple Theatre in Manhattan for its June 2013 to January 2014 run.

In 2016, Hendrix reprised the role of Truvy in Steel Magnolias at the Bucks County Playhouse in New Hope, Pennsylvania. This production was directed by four time Oscar nominee Marsha Mason, and also starred Patricia Richardson, Lucy DeVito, Jessica Walter and Susan Sullivan. On June 9, 2016, this production became the highest-grossing show in the history of the Bucks County Playhouse.

== Activism ==
As an avid animal rights activist, Hendrix has been advocating for animals since 2006, when she also adopted a vegan lifestyle. When not filming, she travels throughout North America and works with organizations around the globe to educate, demonstrate, speak, protest, build habitats, transport and rescue. In 2012, Hendrix founded The Pet Matchmaker, an organization dedicated to celebrating and inspiring the rescue, foster and adoption of homeless pets everywhere. She serves on the board of Stray Rescue of St. Louis as well as the US chapter of No to Dog Meat.

== Personal life ==
Hendrix's cousin is Minnesota Vikings safety Harrison Smith.

In a widely cited August 2025 interview, Hendrix opened up about her romantic life and why she chose a non-traditional path. She stated that while she initially expected to find a lifelong partner, she always knew she never wanted marriage or children. She has a deep, 28-year bond with The Parent Trap co-star Lisa Ann Walter. The publication featured their joint appearance on Ancestry's series unFamiliar, where Walter openly referred to Hendrix as her "life partner" and soulmate. In a November 2025 profile, Hendrix explained to Extra that she and Walter joke about being "a married couple without the romance," supporting each other through decades of life's ups and downs.

She has roots in Oak Ridge and Morristown, Tennessee, including her transition from a local student actor to a professional dancer before a 1992 bicycle accident forced her to pivot to acting.

== Filmography ==
=== Film ===
Year	Title	Role	Notes
1992	Last Dance	Kelly	
1993	Laurel Canyon		TV movie
1995	Road Warriors	Marissa Rayborn	
1995	Lover's Knot	Robin	
1996	Boys & Girls	Blake Benedict	TV movie
1996	Mixed Nuts	Laurie Wynn	TV movie
1996	The Munsters' Scary Little Christmas	Marilyn Munster	TV movie
1997	Romy and Michele's High School Reunion	Lisa Luder	
1998	Carly	Vel Duncan Dobbs	TV movie
1998	The Parent Trap	Meredith Blake	
1999	Molly	Jennifer Thomas	
1999	Superstar	Evian Graham	
2000	Here on Earth	Jennifer Cavanaugh	
2000	Get Your Stuff	Cat Hardy	
2001	Unbakeable	Mrs. Done	Video short
2002	Dawg	Angel	
2002	Wish You Were Dead	Melody 'Jupiter Music' Malloy	
2002	The Big Time	Fleur Soap Announcer	TV movie
2002	Mr. St. Nick	Heidi Gardelle	TV movie
2003	The Hebrew Hammer	Blonde Bombshell	
2003	Our Very First Sex Tape	Woman	Video short
2003	Inspector Gadget 2	Gadget Model 2 / G2	Video
2004	What the #$*! Do We (K)now!?	Jennifer	
2004	Stag Party	Beth	Short film
2005	Bow		TV movie
2005	Bam Bam and Celeste	Jackie	
2006	What the Bleep!?: Down the Rabbit Hole	Jennifer	
2006	Down the P.C.H.	Samantha	
2006	Coffee Date	Bonnie	
2007	LA Blues	Brenda Simon	
2007	The Dukes	Stephanie	
2007	Charlie's Bitch Ass Hos	Ass	Short film
2008	Two Sisters	Carley	TV movie
2008	Jane Doe: Eye of the Beholder	Agnes Dart	TV movie
2008	Tru Loved	Mrs. Muller	Also co-producer
2008	Player 5150	Mrs. Lanzelin	
2008	Twisted Faith	Sandra	Short film and also producer
2008	Friends & Lovers: The Ski Trip 2	Patti	
2008	Food for Thought	Miss Priss	Short film
2009	Friends of Dorothy	Dorothy Roller	Short film
2009	The Cloggers	Kristie	Short film and also producer, director and writer
2009	Rock Slyde	Judy Bee	
2009	Within	Sadie Weiss	
2009	Dear Lemon Lima	Coach Roach	
2009	Haunting At The Beacon	Vanessa Carver	
2010	Nurses Who Kill...	Monroe	Short film
2010	Hated	Betty Churchill	
2010	Magic	Amanda Francis	
2010	Cutthroat	Lacey Andrews	TV movie
2010	Good Intentions	Etta Milford	Also co-producer
2011	Spork	Felicia	
2011	Fading of the Cries	Maggie	
2011	Beverly Hills Chihuahua 2	Colleen Mansfield	Video
2011	Beholder	Evelyn	Short film
2011	Witness Insecurity	Susan	
2011	Deep in the Heart	Patsy	
2011	Material Lies	Deborah	
2012	Anything But Christmas	Grace	
2013	The Violation	Janice Dougherty	Short film
2015	Kids vs Monsters	Mary	
2016	Swing State	Ann Alcott	
2017	Shot	Nurse Marci	
2018	Lez Bomb	Maggie	
2018	Christmas at Pemberley Manor	Caroline	TV movie
2019	Adopt a Highway	Diane Spring	
2019	Burying Yasmeen	Vaginia	
2025	Freakier Friday	Blake Kale	

=== Television ===
Year	Title	Role	Notes
1992	Doogie Howser, M.D.	Fantasy Girl #2	Episode: "The Big Sleep... Not!"
1993	Fallen Angels	Auditioning Blonde #1	Episode: "Since I Don't Have You"
1994	Days of Our Lives	Brandee Fields	Episode: "#1.7193"
1994	The Adventures of Brisco County, Jr.	Dolly Cousins	Episode: "Wild Card"
1995	Ellen	Maya	Episode: "Ballet Class"
1995	Get Smart	Agent 66	7 episodes
1995–1997	Married... with Children	Sandy/Elaine	2 episodes
2000	The Weber Show	Jamie	Episode: "...And Then He Looked at Wendell's Thing"
2001	First Years	Frances O'Donnell	Episode: "The First Thing You Do..."
2001	Special Unit 2	Medusa	Episode: "The Rocks"
2001–2002	The Chronicle	Kristen Martin	7 episodes
2002	Friends	Sally	Episode: "The One with the Pediatrician"
2003	Mister Sterling	Tori Wheeler	Episode: "Statewide Swing"
2003	Watching Ellie	Daisy	Episode: "Date"
2003	CSI: Crime Scene Investigation	Harper Fitzgerald	Episode: "Forever"
2003	Coupling	Molly	Episode: "Holiday"
2003–2005	Joan of Arcadia	Ms. Lischak	17 episodes
2004	Oliver Beene	Aunt Connie	Episode: "X-ray Specs"
2004	Charmed	Clea	Episode: "Witch Wars"
2004	Crossing Jordan	Julie Seaton	Episode: "Dead in the Water"
2004	Quintuplets	Lisa Appleby	Episode: "Thanksgiving Day Charade"
2005	CSI: Miami	Joann Nivens	Episode: "Felony Flight"
2005	Ghost Whisperer	Sandra Holloway	Episode: "Undead Comic"
2006	ER	Brinn	Episode: "Parenthood"
2008	The Middleman	Roxy Wasserman	Episode: "The Accidental Occidental Conception" and "The Cursed Tuba Contingency"
2008	Criminal Minds	Judy Hannity	Episode: "Normal"
2009	Privileged	Elyse Valencour	Episode: "All About Confessions" and "All About Betrayal"
2009	Castle	Melissa Talbot	Episode: "When the Bough Breaks"
2009–2011	Poor Paul	Pauline	5 episodes
2010	The Mentalist	Julia	Episode: "Red Herring"
2010	NCIS: Los Angeles	Vanessa Maragos	Episode: "Little Angels"
2010	Rules of Engagement	Stephanie	Episode: "Refusing to Budget"
2010	Rizzoli & Isles	Geena Young	Episode: "Don't Hate the Player"
2010–2011	90210	Renee	4 episodes
2013	The Client List	Earlene	Episode: "I Ain't Broke But I'm Badly Bent"
2014	Maron	Lauren	Episode: "White Truck"
2014	Anger Management	Warden Hartley	3 episodes
2015–2016	Sex & Drugs & Rock & Roll	Ava	Main role
2017	Stitchers	Kate	Episode: "Kill it Forward"
2019	Proven Innocent	Susan Andrews	Recurring role
2019–2022	Dynasty	Alexis Carrington Colby	Main role (seasons 3–5)
2020	Paradise Lost	Devoe Shifflet	Main role
2025	Dancing with the Stars	Contestant	Season 34

=== Video games ===
Year	Title	Role	Notes
2015	Resident Evil: Revelations 2	Alex Wesker	Likeness and motion capture
