= Vivica A. Fox filmography =

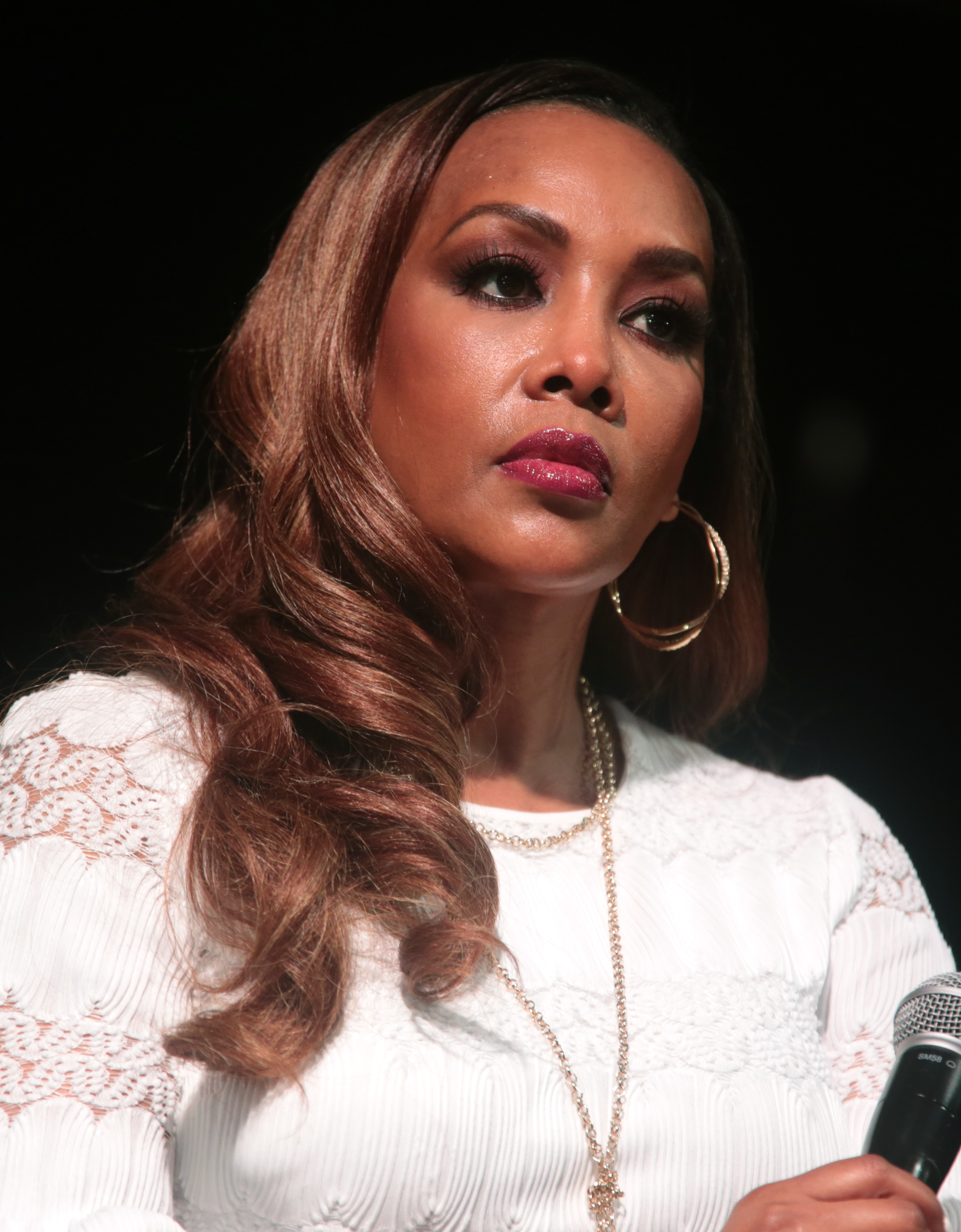
Fox speaking at the 2017 Arizona Ultimate Women's Expo at the Phoenix Convention Center in Phoenix, Arizona

Vivica Anjanetta Fox (born July 30, 1964) is an American actress, producer, director and television host. She appeared in more than 250 feature films, made-for-television movies, and television series. She produced more than 40 feature and television films.

Fox began her career on Soul Train (1982–1983) and played roles on the daytime television soap operas Days of Our Lives (1988) and Generations (1989–1991). In prime-time, she starred opposite Patti LaBelle in the NBC sitcom Out All Night (1992–1993). Fox's breakthrough came in 1996, with roles in two box-office hit films, Roland Emmerich's Independence Day and F. Gary Gray's Set It Off.

Fox has starred in the films Booty Call (1997), Soul Food (1997), Why Do Fools Fall in Love (1998), Kingdom Come (2001), Two Can Play That Game (2001), and Boat Trip (2002). She played Vernita Green in Kill Bill and landed supporting roles in films such as Ella Enchanted (2004), Home Run (2013), Chocolate City (2015), Arkansas (2020) and Bobcat Moretti (2022).

She scored leading roles in the short-lived Fox sitcom Getting Personal (1998) and the CBS medical drama City of Angels (2000). From 2003 to 2006, she co-starred in and produced the Lifetime crime drama series, Missing, for which she received an NAACP Image Award for Outstanding Actress in a Drama Series. Fox starred in more than 25 The Wrong... movies for Lifetime and played Candace Mason in the Fox musical drama series, Empire. Fox's involvement in the entertainment industry goes beyond acting, as she has produced films and TV shows, some of which she didn't star in. And she made her directorial debut with the 2023 biographical crime film, First Lady of BMF: The Tonesa Welch Story.

== Filmography ==
=== Film ===
Year	Title	Role	Notes	Ref.
1989	Born on the Fourth of July	Hooker		
1996	Don't Be a Menace to South Central While Drinking Your Juice in the Hood	Ashtray's Mother		
1996	Independence Day	Jasmine Dubrow		
1996	Set It Off	Francesca "Frankie" Sutton		
1997	Booty Call	Lysterine		
1997	Batman & Robin	Miss B. Haven		
1997	Soul Food	Maxine		
1998	Why Do Fools Fall in Love	Elizabeth "Mickey" Waters		
1999	Idle Hands	Debi LeCure		
1999	Teaching Mrs. Tingle	Miss Gold		
2001	Double Take	Shari	Uncredited cameo	
2001	Kingdom Come	Lucille Slocumb		
2001	Two Can Play That Game	Shante Smith		
2001	Little Secrets	Pauline		
2002	Juwanna Mann	Michelle Langford		
2002	Boat Trip	Felicia		
2003	Ride or Die	Lisa	Also producer	
2003	Kill Bill: Volume 1	Vernita Green/Jeanie Bell/Copperhead		
2004	Motives	Constance Simms	Also producer	
2004	Kill Bill: Volume 2	Vernita Green/Jeanie Bell/Copperhead		
2004	Kill Bill: The Whole Bloody Affair	Vernita Green/Jeanie Bell/Copperhead		
2004	Ella Enchanted	Lucinda		
2004	Blast	Agent Reed		
2004	Hair Show	Herself		
2005	The Salon	Jenny Smith	Also producer	
2005	Getting Played	Andrea Collins	Also producer	
2006	The Hard Corps	Tamara Barclay		
2006	Citizen Duane	Miss Houston		
2007	Natural Born Komics	Herself		
2007	Kickin' It Old Skool	Roxanna Jackson		
2007	Motives 2	Constance Simms	Also producer	
2007	Cover	Zahara Milton		
2007	Father of Lies	Barbara Robinson		
2007	Three Can Play That Game	Shante Smith	Also producer	
2008	San Saba	Kate		
2008	Unstable Fables: Tortoise vs. Hare	Dotty Tortoise	Voice	
2008	Private Valentine: Blonde & Dangerous	Sergeant Louisa Morely		
2009	The Slammin' Salmon	Nutella		
2009	There's a Stranger in my House	Harmony's Mother		
2009	Shark City	Veronica Wolf		
2010	Junkyard Dog	Samantha Deatherage		
2010	Miss Nobody	Nan Wilder		
2010	Trapped: Haitian Nights	Violet Martin		
2010	Love Chronicles: Secrets Revealed	Janet		
2010	The Land of the Astronauts	Studio Executive		
2011	Black Gold	Jackie		
2011	Hollywood & Wine	Jackie Johnson		
2011	Lord, All Men Can't Be Dogs	Lisa		
2011	A Holiday Heist	Dean Erma		
2011	Cheaper to Keep Her	Morgan Mays	Video	
2011	Searching for Angels	Nurse Carter		
2011	1 Out of 7	Devon		
2012	The Marriage Chronicles	Leeah McDaniels		
2012	Black November	Angela		
2012	In the Hive	Billie		
2012	Solid State	Agent Fox		
2012	Cool Cat Stops Bullying	Herself		
2013	Crosstown	Gabrielle		
2013	Caught on Tape	Nadine		
2013	The Pastor and Mrs. Jones	Mrs. Jones		
2013	Doctor Bello	Chloe Durant		
2013	Line of Duty	Agent Montelongo		
2013	Home Run	Helene		
2013	Queen City	Lady Midnight		
2013	Cool Cat Finds a Gun	Celebrity PSA		
2013	Scooby-Doo! Stage Fright	Lotte Lavoie (voice)		
2013	It's Not You, It's Me	Gina		
2013	The Power of Love	PJ Payton		
2013	So This Is Christmas	Sharon		
2013	A Christmas Wedding	Sharon Douglas		
2014	Mercenaries	Donna "Raven" Ravena		
2014	30 Days in Atlanta	Wilson's Wife		
2014	Whatever She Wants	Vivian Wolf		
2015	Celebrity Apprentice: Pillow Fight	Herself	Short	
2015	Cool Cat Saves the Kids	Herself		
2015	Chocolate City	Katherine McCoy		
2015	Terms & Conditions	The Target		
2015	6 Ways to Die	Veronica Smith		
2015	The Good, the Bad, and the Dead	Imani Cole		
2015	Golden Shoes	Mary		
2015	Carter High	Mrs. James		
2016	Gibby	Director		
2016	Independence Day: Resurgence	Jasmine Dubrow		
2017	Garlic & Gunpowder	Mayor Brown		
2017	Fat Camp	Barb		
2017	Chocolate City: Vegas Strip	Katherine McCoy		
2017	Bring It On: Worldwide Cheersmack	Cheer Goddess		
2017	Explosion Jones	Mrs. Jones		
2017	True to the Game	Shoog	Also associate producer	
2017	My Christmas Grandpa	Madison	Short	
2017	Providence Island	Grandma		
2017	Jason's Letter	Sammi Brooks		
2018	The Sky Princess	Moon Queen		
2018	Mr. Malevolent	Chris		
2018	Kinky	Marshalla		
2018	Cool Cat Kids Superhero	Herself		
2019	Crossbreed	President Ellen Henricksen		
2019	Caretakers	Dr. Sherry Cooper		
2019	Dead End			
2019	Fire and Rain	Casey		
2019	2nd Chance for Christmas	Death		
2020	The Bible Collection: Solomon	Queen of Sheba		
2020	Hooking Up	Cindy Brighton		
2020	Arkansas	Her		
2020	Rev	Detective Reid		
2020	A Beautiful Distraction	Claire		
2020	Illicit	Linda Steele		
2020	True to the Game 2	Shoog	Also associate producer	
2021	Secret Society	Charles' Mom		
2021	Aquarium of the Dead	Eddie 'Clu' Cluwirth		
2021	True to the Game 3	Shoog	Also associate producer	
2022	Due Season	Gwen Waters		
2022	Secret Society 2: Never Enough	Celess' Mom		
2022	A Marriage Made in Heaven	Patty Jensen		
2022	Bobcat Moretti	Joanne 'Jo' Wallis	Also executive producer	
2022	Holiday Hideaway	Angela		
2022	Twisted Vines	Sheryl Wright	Also producer	
2023	First Lady of BMF: The Tonesa Welch Story		Director	
2024	Bosco	Willa		
2024	Finding Faith	Samantha		
2024	Not Another Church Movie	Judge Mablean Ephriam		
2024	The Lost Holliday	Cassandra Marshall	Also executive producer	
2024	Every Day	Morgan		
2025	Like Father Like Son	Louise		
2025	The Demon Detective	Mrs Mangi		
2026	Is God Is	Ruby the God		
2026	Plan C	Rita		
2026	Night of the Rising Dead	Ellie		
TBA	Masha's Mushroom	Nyx	Also producer	
TBA	Break the Cycle		Post-production	

=== Television films ===
Year	Title	Role
1995	The Tuskegee Airmen	Charlene
1997	Solomon	Queen of Sheba
1999	A Saintly Switch	Sara Anderson
2000	Hendrix	Faye Pridgeon
2003	Kim Possible: A Sitch in Time	Future Monique (voice)
2006	Keith Barry: Extraordinary	Herself
2009	Degrassi Goes Hollywood	Herself
2010	Farewell Mr. Kringle	Zoe Marsden
2011	The Cookout 2	Hot Female Messenger
2011	Annie Claus is Coming to Town	Lucy
2014	Looking for Mr. Right	Della
2014	Sharknado 2: The Second One	Skye
2014	Blaq Gold	Mayor Morgan Hardaway
2014	A Royal Family Holiday	Mona Levi
2014	Royal Family Christmas	Mona Levi
2016	The Wrong Roommate	Detective Valdez
2016	The Wrong Child	Renee
2016	Summer in the City	Alyssa
2016	A Husband for Christmas	Brooke Harris
2017	The Wrong Student	Gibson
2017	The Wrong Crush	Gwen
2017	Bobbi Kristina	Pat Houston
2017	A Christmas Cruise	Pam Stevenson
2017	The Wrong Man	Jen Bennington
2018	The Wrong Cruise	Claire Tanner
2018	The Last Sharknado: It's About Time	Skye
2018	The Wrong Friend	Principal Atkins
2018	Christmas with a View	Lydia
2018	A Wedding for Christmas	Ms. Reynolds
2018	The Wrong Teacher	Ms. Burns
2019	The Wrong Stepmother	Ms. Price
2019	The Wrong Boy Next Door	Detective Watkins
2019	The Wrong Mommy	Samantha
2019	The Wrong Tutor	Carol
2019	The Wrong Cheerleader	Coach Flynn
2019	Christmas Matchmakers	Kate
2020	The Wrong Housesitter	Debbie
2020	The Wrong Wedding Planner	Detective Jones
2020	The Wrong Stepfather	Principal Higgins
2020	The Wrong Cheerleader Coach	Coach Burke
2020	Joy & Hope	Amanda Parkington
2020	Christmas Together	Deb
2020	A Christmas for Mary	Vivian
2021	The Wrong Real Estate Agent	Julie
2021	The Wrong Fiancé	Charlotte
2021	The Wrong Mr. Right	Sandra
2021	The Wrong Prince Charming	Bridget
2021	The Wrong Valentine	Ms. Connelly
2021	The Wrong Cheer Captain	Carol
2021	The Christmas Thief	Robin
2022	The Wrong Blind Date	Beth
2022	The Wrong High School Sweetheart	Dee Kressley
2022	Harmony in Paradise	Madelyn
2022	A Cozy Christmas Inn	Sharon
2022	Dognapped: Hound for the Holidays	DD Ward
2022	A New Diva’s Christmas Carol	Bastia
2023	Twisted House Sitter 2	Pamela
2023	Sworn Justice: Taken Before Christmas	Laila Porter
2023	A Christmas Intern	Charlotte
2024	The Wrong Life Coach	Tara Gerrity
2024	Make or Bake Christmas	Leslie
2025	The Wrong Obsession	Sabrina
2025	The Wrong Marriage	Kim
2025	A Christmas Murder Mystery	Cynthia Marshall
2025	The Christmas Campaign	Monique
2026	The Wrong Baby Daddy	Robin
2026	The Wrong Housemaid	Sharon

=== Television ===
Year	Title	Role	Notes
1988	Days of Our Lives	Carmen Silva	Regular Cast
1988	China Beach	Toffee Candette	Episode: "Lost and Found: Part 1 & 2"
1989	Who's the Boss?	Emily Franklin	Episode: "Living Dolls"
1989–91	Generations	Maya Reubens	Main Cast
1991	The Fresh Prince of Bel-Air	Janet	Episode: "It Had to Be You"
1991	Beverly Hills, 90210	Sherice Ashe	Episode: "Ashes to Ashes"
1992	Family Matters	Halawna	Episode: "Jailhouse Blues"
1993	Matlock	Celebrity Patient at Clinic	Episode: "The Obsession"
1992–93	Out All Night	Charisse Chamberlain	Main Cast
1994–95, 2026	The Young and the Restless	Stephanie Simmons	Regular Cast
1995	Martin	Patrice	Episode: "The Ex-Files"
1995	The Watcher	Elizabeth	Episode: "Second Chances: Last Time Around/Jack Flash/Hit Man"
1996	Soul Train	Herself/Guest Host	Episode: "MC Hammer/Skillz"
1996	Living Single	Tina	Episode: "Do You Take This Man's Wallet?"
1996	Jungle Cubs	Lima (voice)	Episode: "Treasure of the Middle Jungle"
1997	Soul Train	Herself/Guest Host	Episode: "Zhane/Horace Brown/Jeru the Damaja"
1997	Arsenio	Vicki Atwood	Main Cast
1998	MADtv	Herself	Episode: "Vivica A. Fox"
1998	Getting Personal	Robyn Buckley	Main Cast
1998	Essence Awards	Herself/Co-Host	Main Co-Host
1999	Mysteries and Scandals	Herself	Episode: "Frankie Lymon"
1999	Cosby	Anita	Episode: "War Stories"
1999	The Hughleys	Regina	Recurring cast: Season 1, Guest: Season 2
1999–2004	Hollywood Squares	Herself/Panelist	Recurring Panelist
2000	Who Wants to Be a Millionaire	Herself/Contestant	Episode: "Celebrity Millionaire 2, Show 1 & 3-4"
2000	City of Angels	Dr. Lillian Price	Main Cast: Season 1
2001	The Proud Family	Margaret (voice)	Episode: "Seven Days of Kwanzaa"
2001–02	Intimate Portrait	Herself	2 episodes
2002	MADtv	Herself/Special Guest	Episode: "Episode #7.24"
2002	My Wife and Kids	Kelly Kyle	Episode: "Sister Story"
2003	Jeopardy!	Herself/Celebrity Contestant	Episode: "2003 Celebrity Jeopardy! Game 2"
2003	America's Most Talented Kid	Herself/Judge	Main Judge
2003	The Twilight Zone	Adelaide Tyler	Episode: "Memphis"
2003	Tremors	Delores	Episode: "The Key"
2003	Ozzy & Drix	Ellen Patella (voice)	Recurring role
2003	The Parkers	Claire	Episode: "Kimmie Has Two Moms"
2004	Punk'd	Herself	Episode: "Episode #3.2"
2004	Hip Hop Honors	Herself/Co-Host	Main Co-Host
2004	Alias	Toni Cummings	2 episodes
2004–06	1-800-Missing	FBI Agent Nicole Scott	Main cast: seasons 2-3
2005	Eve	Herself	Episode: "Kung Fu Divas"
2005	Steve Harvey's Big Time Challenge	Herself	Episode: "Episode #2.17"
2005	The Starlet	Herself/Judge	Main Judge
2005	Independent Lens	Herself	Episode: "Double Dare/Piki and Poko: Taking the Dare!"
2005	Hi-Jinks	Herself	Episode: "Vivica Fox"
2005	Loonatics Unleashed	Black Velvet (voice)	Episode: "The Cloak of Black Velvet"
2006	Soul Train Music Awards	Herself/Co-Host	Main Co-Host
2006	Icons	Herself	Episode: "Jamie Kennedy"
2006	TV Land's Top Ten	Herself	Episode: "Top Ten Musical Moments"
2006	Dancing with the Stars	Herself/Contestant	Contestant: Season 3
2006	All of Us	Beverly Hunter	Episode: "Surprise, Surprise: Part 1 & 2"
2007	The Game	Herself	Episode: "When the Chickens Come Home to Roost: Part 1"
2007	Real Life Divas	Herself	Episode: "Vivica A. Fox"
2007–09	Curb Your Enthusiasm	Loretta Black	Recurring cast: Seasons 6-7
2008	Keeping Up with the Kardashians	Herself	Episode: "A New Perspective in New Orleans"
2008	Battleground Earth	Herself	Episode: "You've Got Junk Mail"
2008	The First Annual Worldwide Fido Awards	Herself/Judge	Main Judge
2008	Glam God with Vivica A. Fox	Herself/Host	Main Host
2008	Little Britain USA	The First Lady	Episode: "Episode #1.2"
2008	Law & Order	Kate Tenny	Episode: "Sweetie"
2008–21	Celebrity Family Feud	Herself/Contestant	Recurring guest
2009	Degrassi: The Next Generation	Herself	Episode: "Paradise City, Pt. 2"
2009	The Cougar	Herself/Host	Main Host
2009	Make My Day	Herself	Episode: "Fashionista"
2009	Cake Boss	Herself	Episode: "Painters, Pool & Pink"
2009	Da Kink in My Hair	Karen	Episode: "Oil's Well That Ends Well"
2009	'Til Death	Sarah	Episode: "The Courtship of Eddie's Parents"
2010	Miss America	Herself/Judge	Main Judge
2010	Running Russell Simmons	Herself	Episode: "You Only Live Once"
2010	True Jackson, VP	True's Mom	Episode: "Pajama Party"
2010	Drop Dead Diva	Maria Ellis	Episode: "The Long Road to Napa"
2010–13	Scooby-Doo! Mystery Incorporated	Angel Dynamite/Cassidy Williams (voice)	Recurring role
2011	Miss Universe	Herself/Judge	Main Judge
2011	Who Wants to Be a Millionaire	Herself/Contestant	Episode: "Celebrity Week for Alzheimer's 2"
2011	Melissa & Joey	Tasha	Episode: "Toledo's Next Top Model"
2011	The Protector	Captain Lisa Novak	Episode: "Ghosts"
2011–12	Jerseylicious	Herself	2 episodes
2012	Unsung	Herself	Episode: "Vesta Williams"
2012	Face Off	Herself/Guest Judge	Episode: "Dangerous Beauty"
2012	Don't Sleep! Hosted by T. J. Holmes	Herself/Panelist	Episode: "Black Republicans"
2012	Prank My Mom	Herself/Host	Main Host
2012	Raising Hope	Sara Louise	Episode: "Hogging All the Glory"
2012	Femme Fatales	Dean Vera Rutledge	Episode: "Extracurricular Activities"
2012–15	Mr. Box Office	Casandra Washington	Main cast
2013	Big Rich Texas	Herself/Host	Episode: "Reunion Special: Part 1 & 2"
2013	L.A. Hair	Herself	Episode: "She Wet the Wig"
2013	The Eric Andre Show	Herself	Episode: "Jodie Sweetin; Vivica A. Fox"
2013	Belle's	Herself	Episode: "Birthday Party"
2014	The Real Housewives of Beverly Hills	Herself	Episode: "Star Sighting"
2014–16	Unsung Hollywood	Herself	Recurring guest
2014–17	Celebrity Name Game	Herself/Celebrity Player	Recurring guest
2015	The Apprentice	Herself/Contestant	Contestant: Season 14
2015	Mob Wives	Self; host	Season 5: “Reunion Part 1 & 2”
2015	Sofia the First	Carol (voice)	Episode: "Carol of the Arrow"
2015–16	Mann & Wife	Michelle Mann	Recurring cast: Seasons 1–2
2015–20	Empire	Candace Mason	Recurring cast: Seasons 2–5, Main Cast: Season 6
2016	Kocktails with Khloé	Herself	Episode: "Eat, Drink, Pray"
2016	RuPaul's Drag Race	Herself/Guest Judge	Episode: "Shady Politics"
2016	Gay Skit Happens	Herself	Main Cast
2016	Mr. Pickles	Poison (voice)	Recurring cast: Season 2
2017	Vivica's Black Magic	Herself/Judge	Main Judge
2017	Hip Hop Squares	Herself/Panelist	2 episodes
2017	Battle of the Network Stars	Herself/Contestant	Episode: "TV Lifeguards vs. Trouble Makers"
2017	Worst Cooks in America	Herself/Contestant	Contestant: Season 11: Celebrity Edition 3
2017	50 Central	Curtis' Ex-Girlfriend	Episode: "A New Superhero"
2017–21	Match Game	Herself/Celebrity Panelist	Recurring Panelist
2018	The Real Housewives of Atlanta	Herself	Episode: "Nightmare on Peachtree Street"
2018	Pyramid	Herself/Celebrity Player	Episode: "Ross Mathews vs. Vivica A. Fox and Kelly Osbourne vs. Matt McGorry"
2018–19	Face the Truth	Herself/Host	Main Host
2018–19	Funny You Should Ask	Herself/Celebrity Panelist	Recurring Panelist
2018–19	The Bay	Dr. Angela Foster	Recurring cast: Season 4, Guest: Season 5
2019	Hollywood and African Prestigious Awards	Herself/Host	Main Host
2019–21	To Tell the Truth	Herself/Celebrity Panelist	Recurring Panelist
2020	Stuck with You	Terry Parker	Episode: "It Was All A Dream"
2020	Beat Bobby Flay	Herself/Celebrity Judge	Episode: "So Much Shade"
2020	Celebrity Call Center	Herself	2 episodes
2020	Love & Listings	Herself	Recurring cast: Season 2
2020	I Love New York	Herself/Host	Episode: "Reunion"
2020-23	Cocktails with Queens	Herself/Co-Host	Main Co-Host
2021	25 Words or Less	Herself/Contestant	Recurring guest
2021	Overserved with Lisa Vanderpump	Herself	Episode: "An Evening in Provence: Lance Bass & Vivica A. Fox"
2021	Celebrity Wheel of Fortune	Herself/Contestant	Episode: "Vivica A. Fox, Michelle Trachtenberg, Jason Mraz"
2021	For Real: The Story of Reality TV	Herself	Episode: "Make It Work"
2021	The Masked Singer	Mother Nature	Contestant: Season 6
2021–22	Keeping Up with the Joneses	Robin Jones	Main Cast
2022	Black-ish	Herself	Episode: "My Work-Friend's Wedding"
2022	The Wendy Williams Show	Herself/Co-Host	Recurring Co-Host: Season 14
2022	The Wheel	Herself/Soap Opera Expert	Episode: "Boats, Soaps & Wrestling Ropes"
2022	American Reality Television Awards	Herself/Host	Main Host
2023	Black Pop: Celebrating the Power of Black Culture	Herself	Recurring guest
2023	Celebrity Game Face	Herself/Contestant	Episode: "Chloe and Halle Bury Kevin Under the Sea"
2023	Miss USA 2023	Herself/Judge	Main Judge
2023	See It Loud: The History of Black Television	Herself	Recurring guest
2023	Pictionary	Herself	Recurring guest
2024	Name That Tune	Herself/Contestant	Episode: "It's Destiny!"
2025	Poppa's House	Judge Saywha	Episode: "Saywha?!"

=== Music videos ===
Year	Title	Artist
1985	"Meeting in the Ladies Room"	Klymaxx
1985	"Glow"	Rick James
1989	"Perpetrators"	Randy & the Gypsys
1989	"Rhythm Nation"	Janet Jackson
1991	"Strictly Business"	LL Cool J
1992	"Remember the Time"	Michael Jackson
1994	"Papa'z Song"	2Pac
1994	"Honey"	Aretha Franklin
1996	"You're Makin Me High"	Toni Braxton
1997	"Been Around the World"	Puff Daddy & the Family
1997	"Big Bad Mamma"	Foxy Brown
2000	"As We Lay"	Kelly Price
2003	"Shoulda, Woulda, Coulda"	Brian McKnight
2003	"Girlfriend"	B2K
2010	"Do You Think About Me"	50 Cent
2013	"Age Ain't a Factor"	Jaheim
2021	"Friends and Family"	The Isley Brothers featuring Snoop Dogg
2023	"Kill Bill"	SZA

=== Video games ===
Year	Title	Role	Notes
2012	Hitman: Absolution	LaSandra Dixon	

=== Documentary ===
Year	Title
2005	Ultimate Super Heroes, Vixens & Villains
2006	The Hard Corps: Call to Action
2006	Pam Grier Super Foxy
2006	Blaxploitation to Hip Hop
2007	Testimonies of Faith: Humble Journey's
2007	Conversations 2
2009	My Nappy Roots: A Journey Through Black Hair-itage
2009	11-04-08: The Day of Change
2009	Secrets of Life
2012	Burning Hope: The Making of Hitman Absolution
2013	Whitney Houston Legend
2015	Boulevard Warriors

=== Director ===
Year	Title	Notes
2023	First Lady of BMF: The Tonesa Welch Story	
