= Helene Udy =

American actress (born 1962)

- Born: November 1, 1961 (age 64); Albuquerque, New Mexico, USA
- Occupation: Actress
- Years active: 1980–present

Helene Udy (born November 1, 1962) is an American actress. Udy is best known for her role as Myra Bing on Dr. Quinn, Medicine Woman.

== Filmography ==
=== Film ===
Year	Title	Role	Notes
1980	Hog Wild	Girl In Bed	
1980	Pinball Summer	Suzy	
1981	My Bloody Valentine	Sylvia	
1981	Introducing... Janet	Suzanne	TV movie
1981	Incubus	Sally Harper	
1983	The Dead Zone	Weizak's Mother	
1984	One Night Only	Suzanne	
1985	Toughlove	Wanda	TV movie
1985	Children of the Night	Dallas	TV movie
1987	Tonight's the Night	Woman At Bar	TV movie
1987	Nightflyers	Lilly	
1988	Pin	Marcia Bateman	
1989	The Hollywood Detective	Lois Wednesday	TV movie
1990	Sweet Murder	Lisa Smith	
1990	Object of Desire	-	Video
1999	Follow Your Heart	Jimmy's Secretary	
2000	If Tomorrow Comes	Serena	
2000	Leading with the Right	Suzette MacRoody	
2004	Asleep at the Wheel on the Road to Nowhere	The Waitress	Short
2005	KatieBird *Certifiable Crazy Person	KatieBird Wilkins	Video
2005	Witches of the Caribbean	Mistress Tilda Harriman	Video
2010	The Cross	Sue	Short
2010	12 FL OZ	Sandy Manning	
2012	1313: Frankenqueen	Victoria	Video
2013	For Abigail, Love Benjamin	News Anchor	Short
2013	Tumblers	Odetta	Short
2013	Healers	Dr. Evans	Short
2014	3 Wicked Witches	Donna	
2014	Devilish Charm	Dean Beatrice Wallace	
2014	The Big Bad City	Lena	
2015	Sky Harbor	Mrs. Barry	
2015	Hamlet's Ghost	Mildred	
2016	The Wrong Child	Janine	TV movie
2016	A Husband for Christmas	Gwen	TV movie
2017	The Wrong Student	Coach Hendricks	TV movie
2017	Swamp Freak	Professor Grace O'Leary (voice)	
2017	The Last Revenants	Miss Lydia	
2017	First House on the Hill	Madame Windsor	
2017	Amityville: Evil Never Dies	Prostitute	
2018	House of Demons	Katrina's Mom	
2018	Stirring	Mrs. Werner	
2018	The Wrong Cruise	Abducted Woman	TV movie
2018	The Wrong Friend	Mrs. Hopkins	TV movie
2018	Silent Panic	Lorraine	
2019	Terror Tales	Sonya Hamilton	
2019	Hahajakal	Police Dispatcher	
2019	Evil Under the Skin	Sophie	
2019	The Wrong Boy Next Door	Ms. Hester	
2019	The Wrong Cheerleader	Carla	TV movie
2020	Running with Fear	Mrs. Palmer	
2020	The Wrong Stepfather	Ms. Gibson	TV movie
2020	The Wrong Cheerleader Coach	Dr. Gordon	TV movie
2020	Death Care	Nurse	
2021	The Wrong Real Estate Agent	The Realtor	TV movie
2021	The Wrong Fiancé	Natalya	TV movie
2021	Red Carpet	Marilyn	
2021	The Embalmers	Billie	
2022	The Wrong High School Sweetheart	Jane	TV movie
2022	Last American Horror Show: Volume II	Joanie	
2022	Killer Design	Dr. Thomas	TV movie
2022	Brazen Impact	Sylvia	
2022	Toxic Impulses	Liz	
2022	Estuaries	-	
2022	The Once and Future Smash	Herself	
2022	Deadly Dealings	Helen Stephens	
2022	Blood Covered Chocolate	Candy	
2022	Reflections of a Broken Memory	Jennifer Laks	
2022	Mr.Smith	Claire	Short
2023	The Haunting of the Lady-Jane	Lysette Monk	
2023	Disco Inferno	Lynn	Short
2023	Bittertooth	Vicki Noah	Video
2024	007 - Codename: Bond	The Talent Scout	Short
2024	12 to Midnight	Destiny	
2024	Tin Roof	Charlene	

=== Television ===
Year	Title	Role	Notes
1981-1982	Hangin' In	Janice / Ilsa	Guest Cast: Season 1 & 3
1982	As the World Turns	Frannie Hughes	Episode: "Episode #1.6899"
1984	Paper Dolls	Angie	Episode: "Episode #1.4"
1984	Cagney & Lacey	Danielle	Episode: "Lady Luck"
1985	ABC Afterschool Specials	Tory	Episode: "First the Egg"
1985	The Twilight Zone	Woman #1	Episode: "Wordplay/Dreams for Sale/Chameleon"
1985	The Insiders	-	Episode: "All This and the Old School Tie"
1986	Downtown	-	Episode: "Tracks of My Tears"
1987	Silver Spoons	Sherry	Episode: "Educating Rick"
1988	In the Heat of the Night	Anne Strictland	Episode: "Pilot: Part 1 & 2"
1988	Baby M	Protester	Episode: "Part II"
1991	Charlie Hoover	TV French Woman	Episode: "Two for the Road"
1993	Star Trek: Deep Space Nine	Pel	Episode: "Rules of Acquisition"
1993-1997	Dr. Quinn, Medicine Woman	Myra Bing	Recurring Cast: Season 1-4, Guest: Season 5
1994	Lonesome Dove: The Series	Della	Episode: "Long Shot"
1995	Santo Bugito	Muffy (voice)	Episode: "My Name Is Revenge"
1996	The Real Adventures of Jonny Quest	Various Roles (voice)	Recurring Cast: Season 1, Guest: Season 2
2012	Assignment: Unexplained	Saraa Sylvia	Episode: "Meeting the Team - Bigfoot Hunters"
2019	Fight Night	Micah	Main Cast
2021	Knight's End	-	Episode: "Veritatis"
2022	2041	Dr. Dody	Recurring Cast
2023	As Luck Would Have It	Kimberley	Episode: "Murder for Sale"
