= Meredith Thomas (actress) =

American actress

- Born: Meredith Louise Thomas; Keene, New Hampshire, U.S.
- Occupations: Actor producer
- Years active: 1996–present

Meredith Thomas is an American actress, producer and comedian. She is known for her many Lifetime movies.

== Filmography ==
=== Film ===
Year	Title	Role	Notes
1996	The Midville Pirates	Miss Jenson	Short
1998	Pleasantville	Girl in Soda Shop	
2001	The Homecoming of Jimmy Whitecloud	Vivica Jenson	
2003	Pray Another Day	The Littlest Mermaid	Short
2003	Elevator Etiquette	Woman	Short
2004	Wednesday Afternoon	Business Man's Wife	Short
2004	The Cloth	Nurse Betty	Short
2005	Murder at the Chat Noir	Claudia Nix	Short
2007	Christmas Spirit	Natalie	Short
2008	My Apocalypse	Victim No. 2	
2008	Corpse Run	Mother	
2009	Countdown: Jerusalem	Newscaster	Video
2009	Zombie Holocaust & You!	Mrs. Thompson	Short
2009	HLATV	Meredith	Video
2009	Dealing with the Irate Customer	Ms. Hoskins	Short
2010	DaZe: Vol. Too (sic) – NonSeNse	Cpt. Zezose Fadak	
2010	Falling Snow	Erica	Short
2011	200 mph	Cherrie the Manager	Video
2011	I-Doll	Special Agent Hart	Short
2011	Rideshare	Joanie	
2011	Cowboys & Indians	Sportin' Gal	
2011	Amber	Lynn	Short
2011	Killer Granny	Crystal Siegel	Short
2011	Deadline	Home Invasion Wife	
2012	Air Collision	First Lady Kimberly Phillips	Video
2012	Cleetus Redbone: Apparition Apprehension	Mrs. Mathis	Short
2012	The End of Our Lives	Betty Whitner/Casting Director	
2012	Shark Week	Francine	
2012	106	Martha	Short
2012	Democracy at Work	Jill Kirk	
2013	Camp	Bonnie	
2013	30-Love	Club Member	Short
2014	Need	Mother	Short
2014	Heyday	Casting Director	Short
2015	Beyond	Cypra Employee/board member	Short
2015	Going Bongo	Anne Lerner	
2015	Flight World War II	Meredith	
2015	I'll Eat You Alive	Penny	Short
2015	A Human Story	Marie	Short
2016	Cake	Lisa Lyle	Short
2016	Jeremiah Tower: The Last Magnificent	Denise Hale	
2016	The Dark Tapes	Dr. Macy	
2016	MiddleMan	Cosmetics Woman	Video
2016	A Christmas in Vermont	Dana McCormick	TV movie
2016	Evil Nanny	Claire Benson	TV movie
2016	Coming Out	Nancy	Short
2017	Finding Mother	Waitress	
2017	All the Marbles	Wolf's Mom	Short
2017	Sister Envy	Mara	Short
2017	The Wrong Crush	Mrs. Hessler	TV movie
2017	The Black Hole	Nancy	
2017	The Ugly Christmas Sweater	Helen	Short
2017	A Christmas Cruise	Purser	TV movie
2017	Don't Be Afraid of the Light	Barbara	Short
2018	Get Married or Die	Reporter (voice)	
2018	Witness Unprotected	Mrs. Reynolds	TV movie
2018	Iniquity	Lisa Lyle	Short
2018	Fiancé Killer	Grace	TV movie
2018	Her Only Choice	Dr. Bailey's Nurse	
2018	I, Matter	Sebastian's Mother	
2018	Home Entertainment	Henrietta	Short
2018	We Didn't Start the Fire	Aunt	Short
2018	Rift	Anna Cooper	
2018	A Christmas in Royal Fashion	Melanie Charles	TV movie
2019	Cradle Robber	Ms. Thompson	
2019	Ms. Thompson	Cassandra	
2019	The Wrong Boy Next Door	Lori	TV movie
2019	The Best Gift	JoAnn Davidson	Short
2019	Leaders, Watch This	Herself	Short
2019	Jackie & The Rats	Sharon	Short
2020	The Wrong Wedding Planner	Sherri	TV movie
2020	The Wrong Stepfather	Ava	TV movie
2020	Anonymous Killers	Marlene's Mother	
2020	Toby Goes to Camp	Mayor	
2020	A Pandemic Story	Janet Davis	Short
2021	The Wrong Mr. Right	Kathy	TV movie
2021	Killer Advice	Marsha	
2021	The Wrong Valentine	Mrs. Stein	TV movie
2021	Save the Wedding	Debbie	TV movie
2021	Dangerous Medicine	Ellen	TV movie
2021	Rollers	Maeve Gordon	
2021	Labor of Lies	Christine	TV movie
2021	Killer Profile	Ruth Morris	TV movie
2021	Recipe for Abduction	Sharon	
2021	The Wrong Cheer Captain	Mrs. Jacobs	TV movie
2021	Dangerous Snow Day	Ruth	
2022	The Wrong Blind Date	Laura	TV movie
2022	If Walls Could Talk	Agnes	
2022	Super Inappropriate	Beatrice Cullen/The Signaler	Short
2022	Lord of the Streets	Theresa	
2022	Hey Sarah	Sarah's Mom	Short
2022	A Broken Mother	Lynne	TV movie
2022	Jacked	Ethan's Mother	
2022	Dying to Win	Diane	TV movie
2022	Peridot	Gabriel's Mother	
2022	KillHer	Ms. Singer-Rogers	
2022	Dognapped: Hound for the Holidays	Reporter Jennifer	TV movie
2023	Love at First Like	Helen	TV movie
2023	Open & Shut	Amy Bensen	Short
2023	If I Can't Have You	Liz	TV movie
2023	Lucky Hearts	Laura	TV movie
2023	Discovering Ella	Helen Oakley	Short
2023	What's My Name Again?	Marsha Bluffer	
2023	Night of the Missing	Sheriff Hudson	
2023	A Royal Christmas Holiday	Carol	TV movie
2024	The Wrong Life Coach	Rhonda Wilkes	TV movie
2024	Million Dollar Lethal Listing	Detective Ross	TV movie
2024	Friends with Dental Benefits	Anne	Short
2024	Big Rage	Ava	
2024	A Nanny to Die For	Sarah	TV movie
2024	The Merry Gentlemen	Jodie	
2024	Make or Bake Christmas	Sally	TV movie
2025	The Wrong Obsession	Detective Garo	TV movie
2025	The Wrong Marriage	Detective Sally Hawkins-Levine	TV movie

=== Television ===
Year	Title	Role	Notes
1997	America's Most Wanted	Susan	Episode: "Reed"
1999	One World	Soccer Player	Episode: "Playing the Field"
2000	Pajama Party	Party Girl	Main Cast
2000	Passions	Mary	Episode: "Episode #1.262"
2000	Arrest & Trial	Sherry	Episode: "Porteous' Print"
2001	Strong Medicine	Karen	Episode: "Fix"
2001	Spyder Games	Gorgeous Blonde	Episode: "Episode #1.24"
2001	Undressed	Muscle Mania Contestant	Episode: "Funny Bone"
2001	The Bold and the Beautiful	Gorgeous Woman	Episode: "Episode #1.3492"
2005	Summerland	Emily Hulings	Episode: "The Space Between Us"
2006	Overhaulin'	Mary Tom, Esq.	Episode: "Chip & AJ Trading Places"
2006	The Young and the Restless	Process Server	Episode: "Episode #1.8316"
2006	The Bold and the Beautiful	Fiona	Episode: "Episode #1.4771"
2007	YourLA	Herself/Host	Episode: "July 26, 2007"
2008	The Millionaire Matchmaker	Herself/Stand-up Comic	Episode: "Xander and Joseph"
2008	Nip/Tuck	Rear G-Man No. 1	Episode: "Kyle Ainge"
2008	Notes from the Underbelly	Photographer	Episode: "My Baby's Doctor"
2008	Mystery ER	Nurse Parker	Episode: "Eating Away/A Model's Malady"
2008	Lost Tapes	Rachel Glen	Episode: "Chupacabra" & "Bigfoot"
2009	That Morning Show	Herself/Host	Episode: "September 14, 2009"
2011	I Love Jenni	Herself/Host	Episode: "Mi Corazon"
2011	1000 Ways to Die	Pregnant Woman	Episode: "If You're Dead, Leave a Message and We'll Get Back to You"
2011	Whatever, the Series	Amber	Episode: "Nevermind"
2012	Real Life: The Musical	Herself/Bridesmaid	Episode: "Episode #1.1"
2012	Prank My Mom	Herself	Recurring Cast
2013	Urban Tarzan	Brenda	Episode: "An Actual Tiger on a Golf Course"
2013	Game Over	Mom	Episode: "Gamer"
2013	Sam & Cat	Mrs. Bickley	Episode: "#BabysittingCommercial"
2013	Boomerang Kids	Shannon Gillis	Recurring Cast
2014	Devil in the Details	Kathryn Harms	Episode: "Buzz Kill"
2014	Unusual Suspects	Amy's Teacher	Episode: "High School Homicide"
2014	Rizzoli & Isles	Woman	Episode: "Knockout"
2014	Dating Pains	Vanessa	Recurring Cast
2014	Flip & Glib ...And the Theory of Everything	Cafe Guest	Episode: "Coffee"
2015	Tornado Alley	Selina	Episode: "Swallowed by the Storm"
2015	Murder Book	Dottie Hermance Apgar	Episode: "The Inside Man"
2016	Kwikee Date	Olive	Main Cast
2016	Swedish Dicks	Connie	Episode: "The Blind Leading the Blind"
2017	Feud	Red Carpet Reporter	Episode: "And the Winner Is... (The Oscars of 1963)"
2017	Hidden America with Jonah Ray	Loretta Nix	Episode: "Nashville: America's Got Talent"
2017	Angie Tribeca	Carnie Tribeca	Episode: "Hey, I'm Solvin' Here!"
2017	Crazy Ex-Girlfriend	Woman No. 1	Episode: "To Josh, With Love."
2018	Chicken Girls	Dalia Hadax	Episode: "Surf’s Up"
2018	Vigilante Grammy	Crystal	Main Cast
2018	Strange Angel	Sanctimonious Woman	Episode: "Ritual of the Rival Tribes"
2018	Odd Man Out: The Series	Diane Kramer	Episode: "Unemployment Life"
2019	The Orville	Nurse	Episode: "All the World Is Birthday Cake"
2019	WTF, Baron Davis	Meredith	Episode: "Welcome to Phase 2"
2019	Disconnected	Janine Rogers	Main Cast
2019	Quarter Life Poetry	Mother	Recurring Cast
2019–20	Cake	Meredith Neurath	Recurring Cast: Season 1, Guest: Season 2
2020	Black Monday	White Lady	Episode: "Fore!"
2021	Game of Talents	Lawyer	Episode: "Floating on Air, Fire and Broken Bones"
2021–22	Keeping Up with the Joneses	Stacy/Michelle	Guest Cast: Season 1–2
2023	As Luck Would Have It	Denise	Episode: "Murder for Sale"
2025	Aliwood	Elle Miller	Recurring Cast

=== Music videos ===
Year	Title	Artist	Role
2016	"Born Again Tomorrow"	Bon Jovi	Wife
2017	"Tiny Dancer"	Elton John	Hank Moody Passenger
2017	"Mama Don't Worry (Still Ain't Dirty)"	Bhad Bhabie	Danielle's Mother
2020	"Good in Goodbye"	Madison Beer	Doctor
