= SpectSoft =

Software development company

SpectSoft, LLC
- Industry: software
- Founded: 1997
- Defunct: 2012
- Headquarters: Oakdale, Stanislaus County, California
- Products: CanvasRT; RaveHD; Rave2K; DiceHD; Articles

SpectSoft, LLC, was a software development company started in 1997 to create tools for the professional film and video markets. They were located in Oakdale, Stanislaus County, California.

SpectSoft developed Linux based uncompressed recording, playback, processing systems that are designed to capture and play images and sound from digital cinematography cameras, decks, Telecine and other devices. Products support compressed and uncompressed SD, HD, 2K, 4K and beyond images in 2D or 3D.

== Products ==
=== CanvasRT ===
Real time video processing, VTR emulation, 3D (Stereoscopic) Support and Dailies creation

=== RaveHD ===
A Linux-based SD and HD uncompressed video disk recorder.

=== Rave2K ===
A Linux-based SD, HD, Dual Link-HD and 2K Image, uncompressed video disk recorder.

=== DiceHD ===
A SD and HD, 6 channel video graphics overlay device.

=== Articles ===
Linux Devices

==== Credits ====
- The Spiderwick Chronicles
- Sin City
- Starship Troopers 2
