= Shady Politics =

- RuPaul's Drag Race episode
- Episode no.: Season 8 Episode 7
- Presented by: RuPaul
- Original air date: April 18, 2016

Guest appearances
- Thomas Roberts (guest judge); Vivica A. Fox (guest judge); Andrew Christian

Episode chronology
← Previous "Wizards of Drag"	Next → "RuPaul Book Ball"
- RuPaul's Drag Race season 8

"Shady Politics" is the seventh episode of the eighth season of the American television series RuPaul's Drag Race. It originally aired on April 18, 2016. The episode's main challenge tasks the contestants with pairing up and creating presidential campaign advertisements. Vivica A. Fox and Thomas Roberts are guest judges. Designer Andrew Christian also makes a guest appearance to assist with the mini-challenge.

Bob the Drag Queen and Derrick Barry win the main challenge. Thorgy Thor is eliminated from the competition after placing in the bottom and losing a lip-sync contestant against Chi Chi DeVayne to "And I Am Telling You I'm Not Going" (1982) by Jennifer Holliday.

== Episode ==
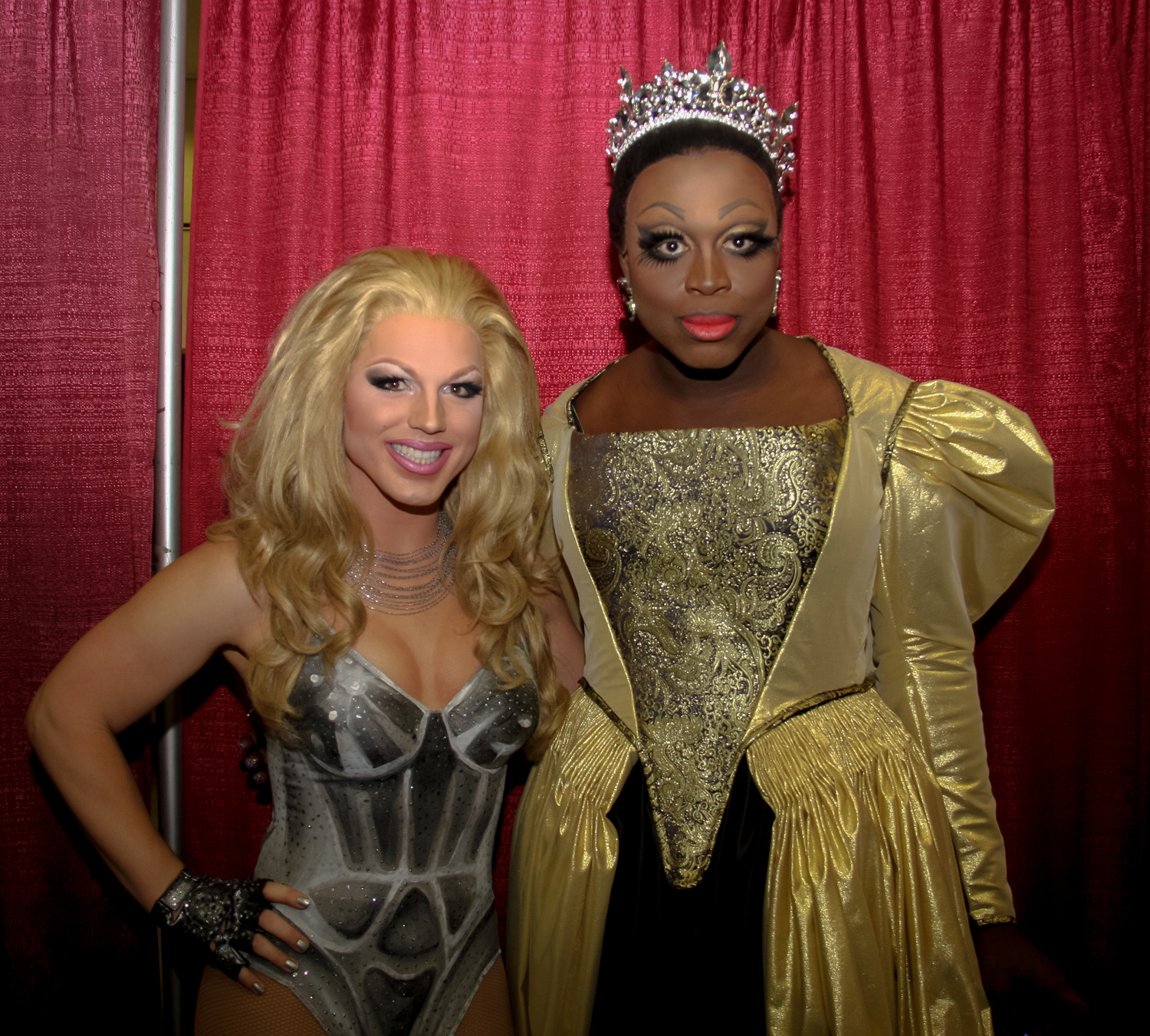
Derrick Barry (left) and Bob the Drag Queen (right) win the main challenge.

The contestants return to the workroom after Robbie Turner's elimination on the previous episode. RuPaul greets the group and invites members of the Pit Crew as well as designer Andrew Christian. RuPaul reveals the mini-challenge, which tasks the contestants with guessing whether members of the Pit Crew prefer a bed's top or bottom bunk. Derrick Barry wins the mini-challenge. RuPaul then reveals the main challenge, which tasks the contestants with pairing up and creating presidential campaign advertisements. The pairs are Bob the Drag Queen with Derrick Barry, Chi Chi DeVayne with Thorgy Thor, and Kim Chi and Naomi Smalls.

The pairs begin to brainstorm and develop their concepts. RuPaul returns to the workroom to reveal who will assist with filming as well as the runway category for the fashion show ("Black and White Realness"). In front of a green screen, the contestants film the advertisements with assistance from Michelle Visage and Carson Kressley. On elimination day, the contestants make final preparations for the fashion show. Bob the Drag Queen talks about her political activities and the importance of voting. Kim Chi discusses her Korean background.

On the main stage, RuPaul welcomes fellow judges Visage and Kressley, as well as guest judges Vivica A. Fox and Thomas Roberts. RuPaul shares the assignment and runway category, then the fashion show commences. The contestants and judges watch the filmed advertisements. The judges deliver their critiques, deliberate, then share the results with the group. Bob the Drag Queen and Derrick Barry are declared the winners of the main challenge. Chi Chi DeVayne with Thorgy Thor place in the bottom and face off in a lip-sync contest to "And I Am Telling You I'm Not Going" (1982) by Jennifer Holliday. Chi Chi DeVayne wins the lip-sync and Thorgy Thor is eliminated from the competition.

== Production and broadcast ==
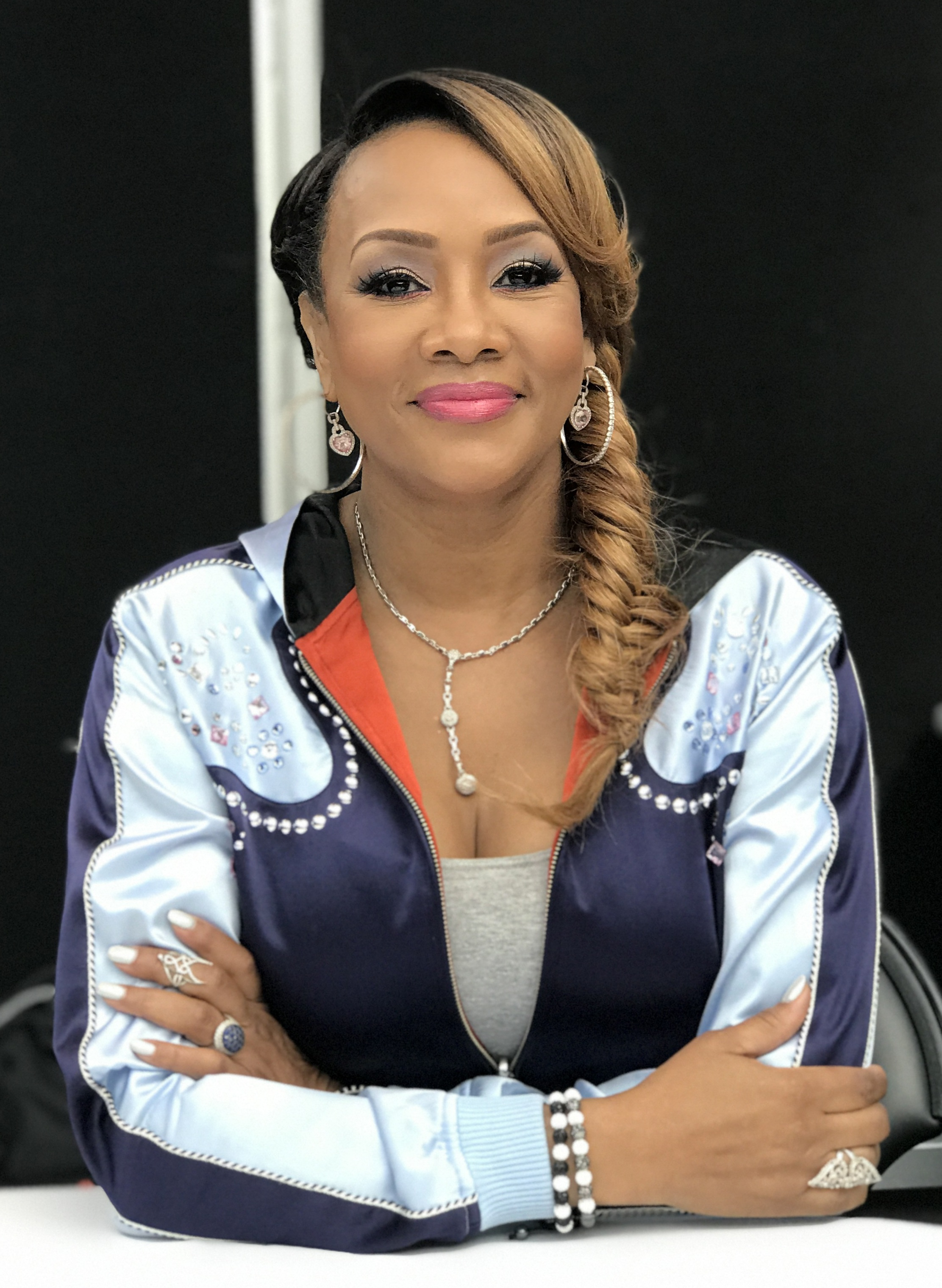
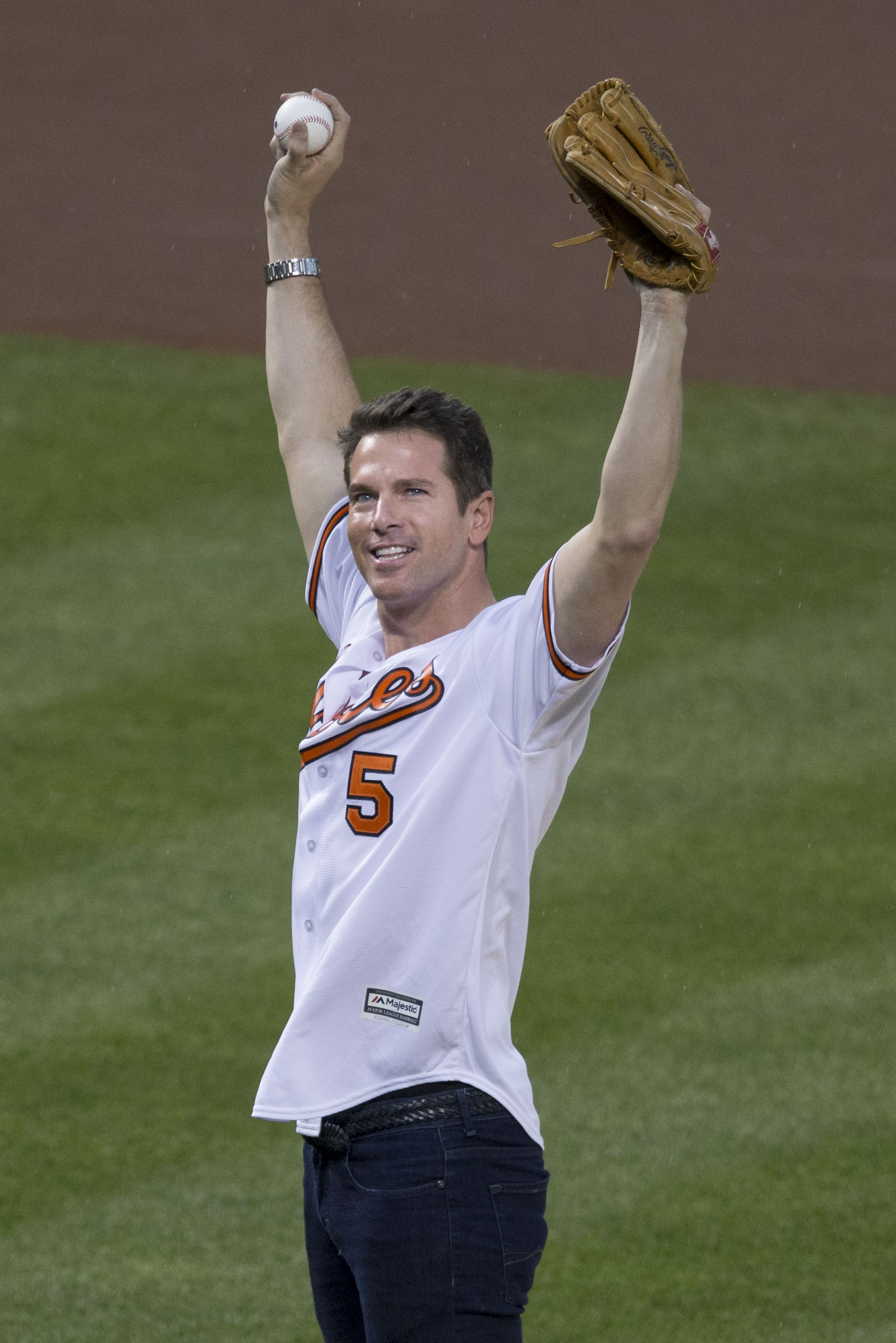
Vivica A. Fox (left) and Thomas Roberts (right) are guest judges.

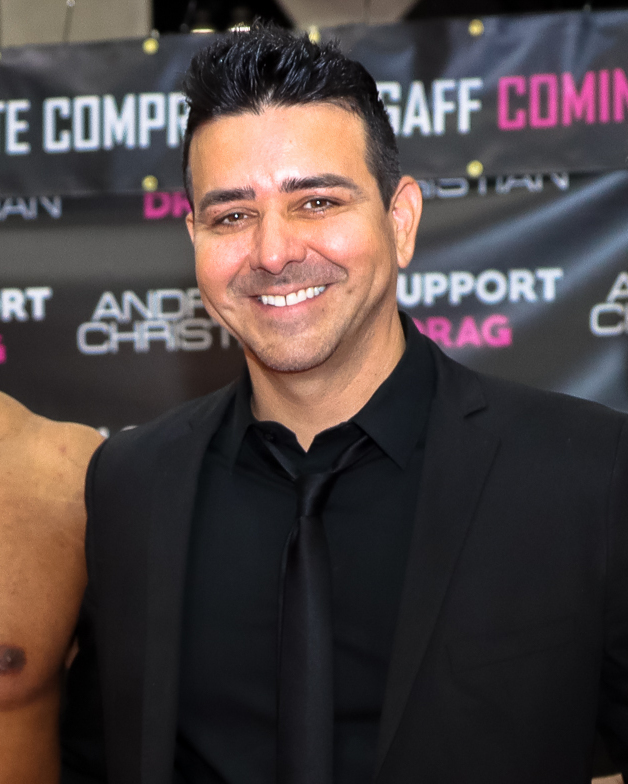
Andrew Christian (pictured at RuPaul's DragCon LA in 2023) also makes a guest appearance.

The episode originally aired on April 18, 2016.

During the lip-sync contest, Chi Chi DeVayne's pearl necklace breaks, sending beads across the stage.

=== Fashion ===
On the main stage, RuPaul wears a purple dress and a blonde wig. For the fashion show, Bob the Drag Queen wears a harlequin-inspired outfit with a blonde wig. Derrick Berry has a long white dress and a long dark wig. Naomi Smalls has a short black dress, tall black boots, and a short dark wig. Kim Chi wears a French clown-inspired outfit with a headpiece. Thorgy Thor wears black pants, a black hat, and a blonde wig. Chi Chi DeVayne has a white gown and a dark wig.

== Reception ==
Oliver Sava of The A.V. Club gave the episode a rating of 'B'. Charlie Grey included the main challenge in Queerty's 2021 list of the show's five funniest political moments.

The episode's lip-sync is considered among the show's by various media outlets, as well as by Drag Race contestant Angeria Paris VanMicheals. In Magazine said, "It was full of passion, and raw emotion. Chi Chi tore apart the cascading beads on the back of her dress, sending them flying all over the stage. The drama of it all was spectacular and will remain one of the most memorable lip syncs in the show's herstory." Billboard ranked the lip-sync thirteenth in 2018. In 2020, Christian Allaire of Vogue said Chi Chi DeVayne's performance "remains one of the best of the series", and BET said her performance was among her "iconic" moments on the show. Additionally, Joe Lynch of Billboard called the contest "unforgettable" and BBC said Chi Chi DeVayne's performance is " considered iconic in Drag Race history". Marcus Wratten of PinkNews called Chi Chi DeVayne's performance "show-stopping" in 2025.

== See also ==
- Vivica A. Fox filmography
