= Hero of the Federation =

Hero of the Federation may refer to:

- Hero of the Russian Federation
- Starship Troopers 2: Hero of the Federation
