= The Realness (RuPaul's Drag Race) =

2016 episode of RuPaul's Drag Race

- RuPaul's Drag Race episode
- Episode no.: Season 8 Episode 9
- Presented by: RuPaul
- Original air date: May 2, 2016

Guest appearance
- Bianca Del Rio

Episode chronology
← Previous "RuPaul Book Ball"	Next → "Grand Finale"
- RuPaul's Drag Race season 8

"The Realness" is the ninth episode of the eighth season of the American television series RuPaul's Drag Race. It originally aired on May 2, 2016. The episode's main challenge tasks the final four contestants with performing in a music video for RuPaul's song "The Realness".

Bianca Del Rio makes a guest appearance. Chi Chi DeVayne is elimination from the competition after losing a lip-sync against the other three contestants. As a result, she is edited out of the music video. Following her death in 2020, the music video was re-released by World of Wonder to include her.

== Episode ==
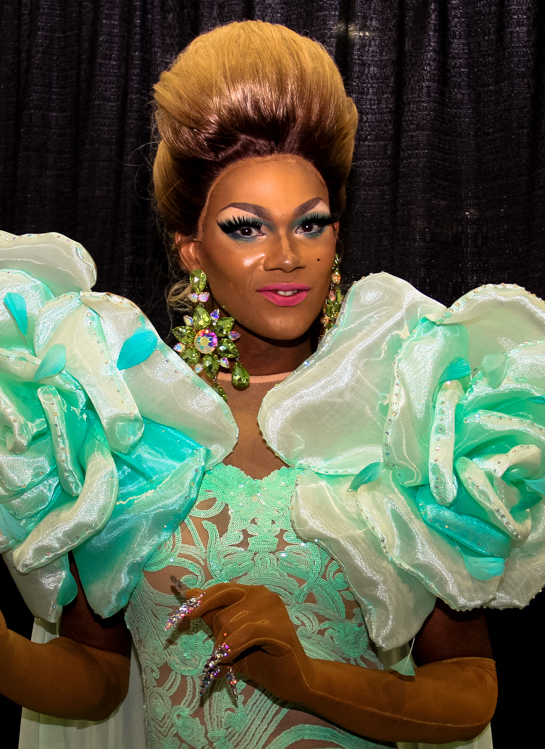
Chi Chi DeVayne was edited out of the music video created as part of the episode's main challenge, for placing in the bottom. Following her death, the production company World of Wonder re-released the video with her included.

The final four contestants (Bob the Drag Queen, Chi Chi DeVayne, Kim Chi, and Naomi Smalls) return to the workroom after Derrick Barry's elimination on the previous episode. On a new day, RuPaul greets the group and reveals the main challenge, which tasks the contestants with performing in a music video for RuPaul's song "The Realness", directed by Jayson Whitmore. RuPaul reveals that the eliminated contestants will be edited out. The contestants film the music video. One scene has each contestant perform while lying on their back and another has each show an "avant-garde" look. The final scene has contestants lip-sync in front of a mirror. As filming wraps, Bianca Del Rio makes a guest appearance.

On elimination day, the contestants make final preparations in the workroom for the fashion show. The contestants talk about the competition and their first impressions of each other. On the main stage, RuPaul welcomes fellow judges Michelle Visage, Carson Kressley, and Ross Mathews. RuPaul shares main challenge and runway assignments, then the fashion show commences. After the contestants present their looks, RuPaul asks the contestants to share their wisdom to younger versions of themselves. The judges deliver their critiques, then RuPaul asks the contestants to share why they should be crowned the winner. The judges deliberate, then share the results with the group. All four contestants face off in a lip-sync contest to "The Realness". Chi Chi DeVayne is eliminated. As a result, she is not featured in the filmed music video.

== Production and broadcast ==
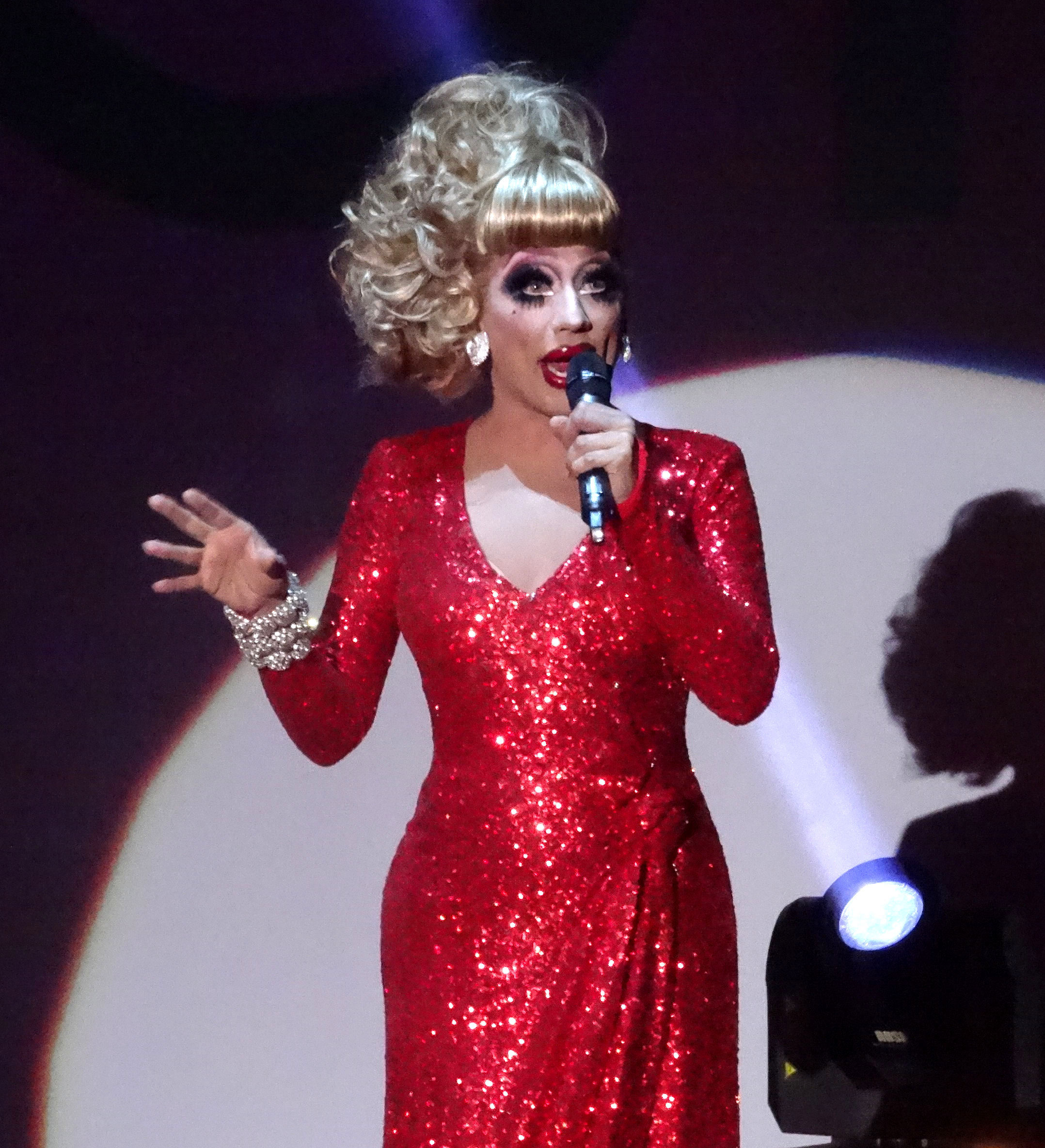
Bianca Del Rio (pictured in 2015) makes a guest appearance.

While filming the music video, Bob the Drag Queen completes a death drop and Kim Chi struggled with the "floatography" (choreography).

The episode originally aired on May 2, 20216.

=== Fashion ===
For the music video's "avant-garde" scene, Bob the Drag Queen has a black-and-white outfit. Kim Chi has a colorful outfit with feathers and a blue wig. Naomi Smalls has a blue outfit, tall white boots, and a short wig. Chi Chi DeVayne has a gown, red shoes, and a blonde wig. For the main stage, RuPaul wears a pink sculptural outfit and a long blonde wig. For the fashion show, the contestants are tasked with presenting their "very best" drag. Bob the Drag Queen wears a black tie-inspired outfit with black leggings and sequined jacket. Chi Chi DeVayne has a pink gown, large earrings, and a dark wig styled as buns. Kim Chi has a black outfit with feathers, a black mask, red nails, and a blonde wig. Naomi Smalls has a pink outfit, large hoop earrings, and a long brown wig.

== Reception ==
Oliver Sava of The A.V. Club gave the episode a rating of 'B+'. Brian Moylan of Vulture rated the episode five out of five stars. Sam Brooks ranked the performance of "The Realness" number 134 in The Spinoff's 2019 "definitive ranking" of the show's 162 lip-sync contests to date.
