= Gina Hiraizumi =

American actress (born 1980)

- Born: Gina Tomoko Hiraizumi; November 20, 1980 (age 45); Torrance, California, USA
- Occupations: Actress; Singer
- Years active: 1999–present
- Spouse: Blayne Yamamoto (m. 2016)
- Children: 1

Gina Hiraizumi (born November 20, 1980) is an American actress and singer known for her Lifetime movies.

== Filmography ==
=== Film ===
Year	Title	Role	Notes
2000	100 Girls	Baby Carriage Girl	
2001	Eyeball Eddie	Popular Girl	Short
2001	All or Nothing	Teen Diva	Video
2001	1st Testament CIA Vengeance	Kaori Nakayama	Video
2001	The Source	Stacey	
2001	Close to Home	Becky	Short
2001	Trysting	Ann	Short
2002	Kingston High	Katelyn	
2002	Soap Girl	Asia	
2002	Camp Utopia	Bongo Player	
2003	Scream Queen	Leilani	Video
2003	Day of Independence	Rose	Short
2005	The Hot Spot	Venus	
2006	Only the Brave	Eleanor Takase	
2007	Damn the Past!	Shakira	Short
2009	The LBC: Smile Now, Cry Later	Sarah Chea	
2012	The Monogamy Experiment	Yonda Rider	
2016	Till the Aces Come	Crystal	
2016	Evil Nanny	Kayla	TV movie
2017	The Fast and the Fierce	Amy	
2017	The Wrong Crush	Dr. Monroe	TV movie
2017	A Very Merry Toy Store	Aviana	TV movie
2017	The Ugly Christmas Sweater	Lori	Short
2017	A Christmas Cruise	Louise	TV movie
2017	The Wrong Man	Carrie Knox	TV movie
2017	Unbound	Dai	Short
2017	The Plural of Blood	Reporter #2	Short
2018	Maki	Keiko	
2018	The Wrong Daughter	Inspector Larsen	TV movie
2018	Bloodline: Lovesick 2	District Attorney Akemi	
2018	The Silk Road	Chieko	
2018	Dying for the Crown	Susie	
2018	Deadly Runway	TV Reporter	TV movie
2018	The Wrong Friend	Becca	TV movie
2018	Truth or Double Dare (TODD)	Claudia	
2018	Christmas Harmony	Trisha	
2018	A Christmas in Royal Fashion	Nurse Phillips	
2019	Time for Tea	Miyo	Short
2019	Sister of the Bride	Anna	TV movie
2019	The Wrong Stepmother	Cynthia	TV movie
2019	What Lies West	Sherri	
2019	Girl Games	Veronica Kitagawa	
2020	A Dark Foe	Female Reporter	
2020	Lazy Susan	News Anchor	
2020	The Wrong Wedding Planner	Gemma	TV movie
2020	Pool Boy Nightmare	Detective Davidson	TV movie
2020	Killer Competition	Principal McCain	TV movie
2020	Last Three Days	Amane	
2020	Chocolate Covered Christmas	Maggie	TV movie
2021	The Wrong Real Estate Agent	Annie	TV movie
2021	The Wrong Fiancé	Jen	TV movie
2021	Killer Advice	Simone	
2021	Courting Mom and Dad	Reporter Allison	
2022	Labor, Lies and Murder	Lisa	
2023	If I Can't Have You	Lily	TV movie
2023	The Nana Project	Lisa Chen	
2024	Cruise Ship Murder	Detective Scott	TV movie
2024	Make or Bake Christmas	Patti	
2025	The Wrong Obsession	Lisa	TV movie

=== Television ===
Year	Title	Role	Notes
1999	Frat Ratz	Vanessa	Episode: "Real Unreal"
2001	Spyder Games	Akiko	Episode: "Episode #1.15"
2001	City Guys	Yasmina	Episode: "Prose and Cons"
2002	Port Charles	Casey #2	Episode: "April 9, 2002"
2003	Lucky	Minako	Episode: "Something for Everyone"
2004	Quintuplets	Jackie	Episode: "Boobs on the Run"
2007	Shark	2nd Young Woman	Episode: "Porn Free"
2009	Titan Maximum	J-pop Singer (voice)	Episode: "Pilot"
2009	FlashForward	Flight Attendant	Episode: "Believe"
2010	Castle	Laurie Hill	Episode: "A Rose for Everafter"
2014	Seers of the Ninth Island	Dr. Lisa Choo	Main Cast
2016	Deadly Sins	Rosalina Misina Mendoza	Episode: "Episode #5.6"
2018	Black-ish	Tiffany	Episode: "Friends Without Benefits"
2018	Mani	Miss Haruto	Main Cast: Season 3
2020	Hawaii Five-0	Maile	Episode: "E ho'i na keiki oki uaua o na pali"
2021	Mr. Mayor	Reporter #2	Episode: "Pilot"
2021	Good Girls	Well-Dressed Mom	Episode: "Big Kahuna"
2021	Dynasty	Barbara	Episode: "That Unfortunate Dinner"
2021	Creepshow	Dr. Mai Sato	Episode: "The Last Tsuburaya/Okay, I'll Bite!"
2021	Doom Patrol	Sachiko / The Quiz	Recurring Cast: Season 3

=== Video game ===
Year	Title	Role	Notes
2006	WWE SmackDown vs. Raw 2007	Jillian Hall/Additional Voices (voice)	
