= Rubberface =

- VHS cover
- Also known as: Introducing... Janet
- Genre: Comedy
- Written by: Nada Harcourt; Michael Glassbourg
- Directed by: Glen Salzman; Rebecca Yates
- Starring: Jim Carrey; Adah Glassbourg
- Music by: Rainer Wiens
- Country of origin: Canada
- Original language: English

Production
- Producers: Glen Salzman; Rebecca Yates
- Cinematography: Rene Ohashi
- Editors: James Lahti; Mairin Wilkinson
- Running time: 55 minutes
- Production companies: Canadian Broadcasting Corporation; CineFlics

Original release
- Release: September 21, 1981

Rubberface is a 1981 television film aired on CBC and starring Jim Carrey in his film and television debut. Originally titled Introducing... Janet, it was changed to Rubberface for the video release after Carrey's success.

== Plot ==
Janet is a high school student who frequently acts out as a class clown, as she feels it is the only way she can gain acceptance from her peers. She is tasked with writing an essay about what makes people laugh. During her investigations she encounters a dishwasher named Tony, who wants to become a professional comedian. He's dismayed by his lack of success and solicits Janet's help in creating a good act for an upcoming standup competition. In exchange, Tony recommends that Janet be herself rather than continually play the clown.

At the contest Tony pretends to have laryngitis and urges Janet to take his place on stage. Although nervous, Janet is successful in making the audience laugh.

== Cast ==
- Adah Glassbourg as Janet Taylor
- Jim Carrey as Tony Moroni
- Lynne Deragon as Judith
- Ann-Marie MacDonald as Merilee
- Helene Udy as Suzanne
- Larry Horowitz as Freddy Goodman
- Marla Lukofsky as Donna Cherry
- Michael Glassbourg as Carlos Smith

== Production ==
The film's script was written by Michael Glassbourg, who portrayed a stand-up comedian in the film. His younger sister Adah was cast as Janet after he encouraged her to audition. She did not believe that she would receive the role as she "was 25, inexperienced and slender trying out for a part of a fat 16-year-old." The Glassbourgs' younger sibling Emil was also cast in a minor role as an ice-cream vendor.

Filming took place in Toronto and Adah gained 10 pounds in order to portray Janet. Jim Carrey was brought in to portray the character of Tony; the CBC later noted that he was 19-years-old when the film was made. The film marked the first appearance of Jim Carrey in film or television.

== Release ==
Rubberface, initially titled Introducing... Janet, was first aired as a made-for-television film for the Canadian Broadcasting Corporation on 20 September 1981. The title and cover art were later changed for Vidmark's home video release in order to focus on Jim Carrey, who was in approximately a fourth of the film and was not the central character.

Rubberface was released on DVD through Lionsgate Home Entertainment on January 23, 2007.

== Reception ==
Jim Bawden of The Toronto Star reviewed the film in 1981, noting that the initial portrayal of Janet and high school cliques were fairly accurate but that the film's upbeat ending felt contrived and "inconsistent with everything she has experienced up until then."

The film received additional attention after its re-release with a new title to capitalize on Carrey's success. Randall King covered the movie's Vidmark release in 1995 for The Winnipeg Sun, calling it "simply another example of recycled success."

Jeffrey Robinson of DVD Talk reviewed the film, calling it mediocre and that while there were some decent laughs and chemistry between the performers, the film was "not all that entertaining". Donald Liebenson of The Weekender covered Rubberface in a retrospective of Carrey's work, calling it "actually a very sweet 48-minute featurette".
