= Stealing Candy =

2003 film directed by Mark L. Lester

- Directed by: Mark L. Lester
- Written by: Dana Dubovsky; Randall Frakes; C. Courtney Joyner; Mark L. Lester
- Starring: Daniel Baldwin; Coolio; Alex McArthur; Jenya Lano
- Release date: 2003
- Running time: 83 minutes
- Country: United States
- Language: English

Stealing Candy is a 2003 thriller film directed by Mark L. Lester and starring Daniel Baldwin. It was produced by Lester's production company American World Pictures.

== Premise ==
The film revolves around three ex-cons who kidnap a famous Hollywood actress known for refusing to do nude scenes and persuade her to have sex on camera for a pay-per-view website.

By the end, it is revealed that Candy and one of the cons, Fred, were in it from the get-go, and orchestrated the entire thing to promote her career. In a final backstab, she makes it appear as if he threatens her life, and perform a murder-by-cop on him, thus making sure the truth would never be revealed.

== Cast ==
- Daniel Baldwin as Walt Gearson
- Coolio as Brad Vorman
- Alex McArthur as Fred Dowd
- Jenya Lano as Candy Tyler
- Jeff Wincott as Spinell
