= Jessica Morris =

American actress

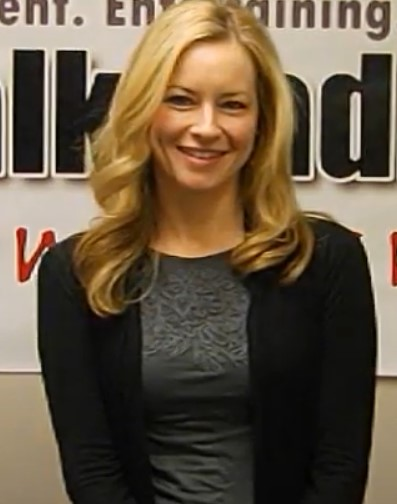
- Morris in 2016
- Occupation: Actress
- Years active: 1999–present

Jessica Morris is an American actress. She is known for numerous roles in Lifetime movies. Some of her prominent Lifetime movies are part of Vivica A. Fox's The Wrong... film series, which includes The Wrong Roommate (2016), The Wrong Man (2017), and The Wrong Teacher (2018) and Revenge In The Deep End (2020). Aside from her Lifetime movie roles, she also had recurring roles on One Life to Live, Beacon Hill, and Party of Five.

== Career ==
After several small film and television roles, Morris was cast as the dysfunctional Jennifer Rappaport on the ABC soap opera One Life to Live, a role she portrayed from 2001 to 2005 and in a dream sequence on October 1, 2008.

In 2008, Morris appeared in the comedy Role Models as "Linda the Teacher". She was in the cast of the 2010 fantasy film Fading of the Cries. In 2014, Morris played the lead role in the horror film Haunting of the Innocent.

In 2014, Morris played Diane Hamilton in the soap opera web series Beacon Hill.

== Filmography ==
=== Film ===
Year	Title	Role	Notes
1999	The Weekend	Sarah	
1999	All Shook Up	Bartender	
2000	Bloody Murder	Julie 'Jewels' McConnell	Video
2000	Hourglass	Miranda	Short
2006	Afterlife	Chelsea	Short
2007	Dead Man's Hand	Melissa	
2007	Decadent Evil II	Lena	Video
2008	Dangerous Worry Dolls	Eva	Video
2008	Senior Skip Day	Denise	Video
2008	Role Models	Linda the Teacher	
2009	What We Became	Sarah Miller	Short
2010	El Mariachi Leprechaun	Shuga Flakex	Short
2010	Kleshnov	Tanya	Short
2010	Fading of the Cries	Malyhne	
2011	Venom	Helen Pace	
2011	Interpersonal Exopolitics	Darlene Hartugen	Short
2011	Boy Toy	Yoga Student	
2011	Killer on the Loose	-	Short
2012	Save the Date	Cindy	
2012	The Dead Want Women	Reese	Video
2012	Reel Evil	Kennedy	
2012	Santa's Summer House	Constance	
2013	Hearts Gamble	Jenn	Short
2013	Infinity	Melissa	Short
2014	Haunting of the Innocent	Brenda	
2014	Devilish Charm	Suzette Williams	
2014	Trophy Heads	Jessica	
2014	Ladybug	Rosemarie	Short
2014	In Search of America, Inshallah	Green	Short
2014	Alone Together	Woman in Photograph	Short
2015	First Love	Narrator (voice)	Short
2015	Pocket Listing	Emily	
2015	On the Horizon	Amy	
2016	The Wrong Roommate	Laurie Valentine	TV movie
2016	Timber the Treasure Dog	Jamie Fanning	
2016	Amazing Ape	Riley	
2016	Nightmare Nurse	Connie	TV movie
2016	Hidden Truth	Veronique	
2016	Bloody Bobby	Crystal Cochran	
2016	The 6th Friend	Katie	
2016	Sorority Slaughterhouse	Allie	
2016	A Husband for Christmas	Agent Marie Adams	TV movie
2016	Eternal Salvation	Amy Wright	
2016	Lucifer	Danielle Cain	
2016	The Hollywouldn'ts	Peach Allure	
2017	Aggregate	Erin	
2017	Be Mine	Samantha	Short
2017	The Wrong Student	Kelly Halligan	TV movie
2017	Evil Bong 666	Misty	
2017	American Exorcism	Janelle	
2017	Jello	Tanya	Short
2017	Puppet Master: Axis Termination	Bar Patroness	
2017	Delivering Christmas	Lauren	Short
2017	A Christmas Cruise	Becky	TV movie
2017	Midnight Clear	Julie	Short
2017	The Wrong Man	Kim Cassidy	TV movie
2017	Nightmare Box	Linda	Short
2018	Living Among Us	Sybil	
2018	Evil Bong 777	Misty	
2018	Another Plan from Outer Space	Commander Strickland	
2018	I Will Find You Destiny	Sara	Short
2018	Shoelaces for Christmas	Jan Miller	TV movie
2018	The Wrong Teacher	Charlotte Hansen	TV movie
2018	Hell Hath Enlarged Herselfr	Alison	Short
2019	Chase	Blair	
2019	The Wrong Mommy	Melanie	TV movie
2019	Art of the Dead	Gina Wilson	
2019	A Mermaid for Christmas	Daphne	TV movie
2020	The 6th Degree	Lori	
2020	Pool Boy Nightmare	Gale	TV movie
2020	Ex Gratia	Angela	Short
2021	Legend Of Fall Creek	Crystal Cochran	
2021	The Wrong Fiancé	Abby	TV movie
2021	Crabs!	Annalise Menrath	
2021	Danger in the Spotlight	Martha	TV movie
2021	Abduction Runs in the Family	Alyssa Manning	TV movie
2021	Twisted Little Lies	Brianna Scott	TV movie
2022	Secret Lives of Housewives	Kendra Davis	TV movie
2022	Bodyguard Seduction	Charly	TV movie
2022	Tommyknockers	Julia Ann Swift	
2023	Secrets on Greek Row	Carolyn	
2023	Murder Syndicate	Becca	
2023	End Times	Stella	
2023	End Times (II)	Stella	
2023	My Doctor's Secret Life	Veronica	
2023	(DIS)CONNECTED	Mina	Short
2023	Break In	Heather Lockwood	
2024	Secret Life of a Sorority Girl	Cheryl	TV movie
2024	A Deadly Threat to My Family	Marielle Harris	TV movie
2024	Continental Split	Dr. Cami Weddle	
2024	Couples Retreat Murder	Becky	TV movie
2024	The Memory in My Heart	Helen Holland	
2024	Secrets Between Sisters	Cassie Wilcot	TV movie

=== Television ===
Year	Title	Role	Notes
2000	City Guys	Andrea	Episode: "Get to Preppin'"
2001	Undressed	Liz	Recurring Cast: Season 4
2001–08	One Life to Live	Jennifer Rappaport	Regular Cast
2006	South Beach	Hayley	Episode: "I'll Do What I Want to Do"
2007	Mind of Mencia	Pretty White Girl	Episode: "Episode #3.21"
2008	Sorority Forever	Natalie Gold	Main Cast
2009	CSI: NY	Melody Spector	Episode: "Blacklist"
2014	Mixology	Janice	Episode: "Liv & Ron"
2014	Sex Sent Me to the ER	Louise	Episode: "Sticky Situation"
2014	Perception	Linda Mullane	Episode: "Painless"
2014	The Other Hef	Jess	Main Cast
2014-20	Beacon Hill	Diane Hamilton	Recurring Cast
2016	Rosewood	Mandy Willing	Episode: "Ballistics and BFFs"
2016	The Bay	Katherine	Episode: "Episode #2.11" & "#2.12"
2016	Ladies of the Lake	Crystal Amhurst	Main Cast
2018	Ladies of the Lake: Return to Avalon	Crystal Amhurst	Main Cast
2020	Party of Five	Helene	Recurring Cast
2021	The Upshaws	Amy	Episode: "Big Plans"
2022	Beyond the Dark	Julie	Episode: "Midnight Clear"
2024	Stripped	Crystal	Recurring Cast
