= Shrieker (film) =

- Directed by: David DeCoteau
- Written by: Benjamin Carr
- Produced by: Charles Band (executive producer); Kirk Edward Hansen
- Starring: Tanya Dempsey; Parry Shen; Jenya Lano; Jason-Shane Scott; Jamie Gannon; Alison Cuffe; Roger Crowe; Chris Boyd; Brannon Gould; Rick Buono
- Distributed by: Full Moon Entertainment; Multicom Entertainment Group Inc.
- Release date: 1998
- Running time: 84 minutes
- Language: English

Shrieker is a 1998 American horror film directed by David DeCoteau and produced by Charles Band.

== Plot ==
Clark, a young Mathematics major at a University, thinks she's found the best deal for student housing: a group of squatters who live in an abandoned hospital secretly. The quirky residents let her into their community provided she follow the rules, including not telling anyone about her living arrangements. All seems wonderful, until she discovers that the reason that the hospital was abandoned was a series of murders in the 1940s by a strange "shrieking killer" who was never captured - and the discovery that someone who's living in the hospital is using occult means to bring back the demonic "Shrieker".

== Cast ==
- Tanya Dempsey as Clark
- Parry Shen as David (credited as Parry Allen)
- Jenya Lano as Elaine
- Jason-Shane Scott as Orderly #1
- Jamie Gannon as Zak
- Alison Cuffe as Tanya
- Thomas R. Martin as Robert (credited as Roger Crowe)
- Chris Boyd as Mike
- Brannon Gould as Orderly #2
- Rick Buono as The Shrieker

== Development ==
Shrieker was shot on a budget of $150,000 and on 33 mm anamorphic film.

== Release ==
Shrieker was released on DVD by Wizard on March 3, 1998. It was later re-released in both 2003 and 2007 by Full Moon Home Video and Vision Films respectively.

== Reception ==
The Tubi Tuesdays Podcast stated in Episode 13 that Shrieker is a confusing mess of a film, with the sub-plot of students squatting in an abandoned hospital made no sense. The Schlock Pit's Matty Budrewic wrote a retrospective on the film, noting that the film suffered from being "reduced to a pan n' scan hash" but that "Thankfully, a neat movie is a neat movie, and no amount of hackneyed reframing can stop Shrieker from succeeding as a solid piece of spooky entertainment." Films Fantastique's review stated "Despite its weak writing, the film is watachable enough, enhanced by beautiful cinematography from Brad Rushing and original special effects makeup by Mark Williams."
