= Witches of the Caribbean =

2005 horror film directed by David DeCoteau

- Directed by: David Decoteau
- Written by: Jana K. Arnold
- Produced by: Allison Andrade (associate producer); Jeffrey Schenck (co-producer); Paul Colichman; Stephen P. Jarchow (executive producers); Charles Arthur Berg (line producer)
- Starring: Joanna Cassidy; Nicole Cavazos; Nicole Marie Monica; Kelli Giddish; Michael King; Nina Tapanin; Kyle Jordan; Ric Sarabia; Helene Udy; Catherine Munden
- Cinematography: Robert Hayes
- Edited by: Danny Draven
- Music by: Jojo Draven
- Distributed by: Image Entertainment Inc.
- Release date: July 8, 2005
- Running time: 82 min.
- Language: English

Witches of the Caribbean is a 2005 horror film directed by David DeCoteau and starring Joanna Cassidy, Nicole Cavazos, Nicole Marie Monica, Kelli Giddish, Michael King, Nina Tapanin, Kyle Jordan, Ric Sarabia, Helene Udy, and Catherine Munden.

== Plot summary ==
Seventeen-year-old Angela suffers from a recurring nightmare about a 16th-century witch burned to death on a dark and mysterious beach. To find an explanation to this nightmare and reclaim her life, she flies to a two-week retreat for troubled teens on the Caribbean island of Matau, run by noted child psychologist Professor Avebury. Little does Angela realize that Matau hides a horrific secret history, nor does she know that her nightmares stem from this very spot.
Upon her arrival, Angela meets the other troubled teenagers attending the retreat, all of whom seem to play a role in the mystery of her dream. In particular, the enigmatic Bethany claims to be a witch and secretly seduces the other teens into joining her coven. Gradually, Angela realizes that her nightmares aren't dreams at all, but memories of her past life. As the true nature of the frightening nightmare unfolds, Bethany seems determined to either seduce or destroy Angela. With the witching hour ticking closer, Angela must solve the mystery of the Caribbean island and its legendary witch coven.

== Cast ==
- Joanna Cassidy as Professor Avebury
- Nicole Cavazos as Angela
- Nicole Marie Monica as Bethany Hunter
- Kelli Giddish as Clara Niles
- Michael King as Cutter
- Nina Tapanin as Enid
- Kyle Jordan as Jerry
- Ric Sarabia as Magistrate Harriman
- Helene Udy as Mistress Tilda Harriman
- Catherine Munden as Anne Prescott

== Production ==
The film was shot entirely in the Turks and Caicos Islands, on Grand Turk Island.

== See also ==
- List of films about witchcraft
