= RuPaul Book Ball =

- RuPaul's Drag Race episode
- Episode no.: Season 8 Episode 8
- Presented by: RuPaul
- Original air date: April 25, 2016

Guest appearances
- Amy Sedaris (guest judge); David Sedaris (guest judge)

Episode chronology
← Previous "Shady Politics"	Next → "The Realness"
- RuPaul's Drag Race season 8

"RuPaul Book Ball" is the eighth episode of the eighth season of the American television series RuPaul's Drag Race. It originally aired on April 25, 2016. The episode's main challenge tasks the contestants with presenting three looks in a fashion show. Amy and David Sedaris are guest judges. Kim Chi wins the main challenge. Derrick Barry is eliminated from the competition after placing in the bottom and losing a lip-sync contest against Bob the Drag Queen to "You Make Me Feel (Mighty Real)" by Sylvester.

== Episode ==
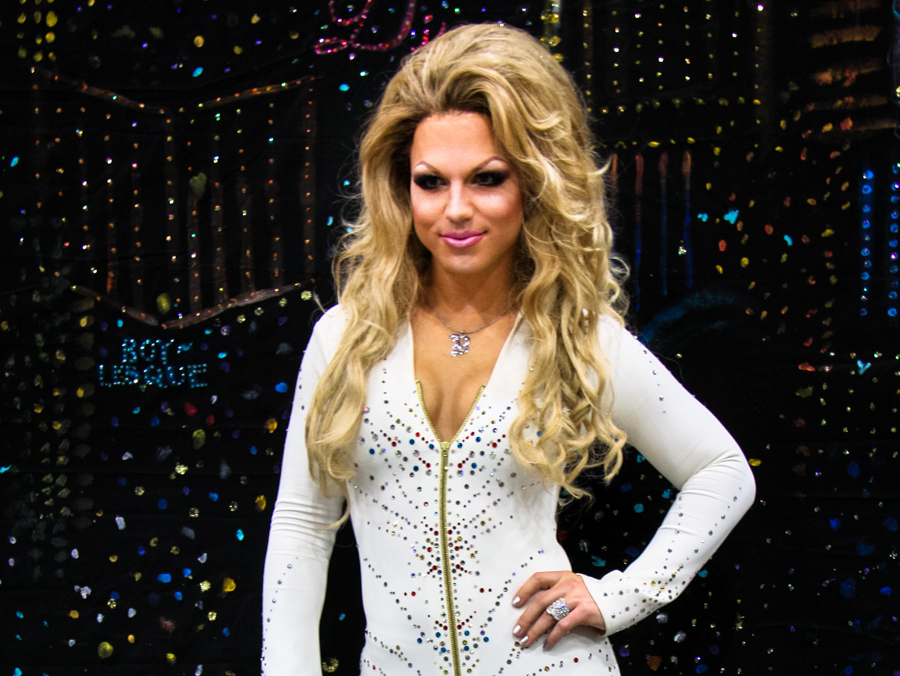
Derrick Barry (pictured in 2018) is eliminated from the competition.

The contestants return to the workroom after Thorgy Thor's elimination on the previous episode. On a new day, RuPaul greets the group and reveals the mini-challenge, which tasks the contestants with impersonating each other as part of a puppet show. Kim Chi impersonates Chi Chi DeVayne, who impersonates Bob the Drag Queen. Derrick Barry and Naomi Smalls impersonate each other, and Bob the Drag Queen impersonates Kim Chi. Chi Chi DeVayne wins the mini-challenge. RuPaul then reveals the main challenge, which tasks the contestants with presenting three looks. The categories are: "Baby Drag Realness", "That's My Mama Realness", and "Autobiographical Eleganza Extravaganza", which requires contestants to designing outfits from books "that would tell their life stories".

As the contestants start to prepare, there is friction between Derrick Barry and Naomi Smalls. RuPaul returns to the workroom to meet with each contestant, asking questions and offering advice. Bob the Drag Queen talks about her mother and her mother's illness. Naomi Smalls also talks about her mother. Kim Chi talks about her relationship with her mother. Before leaving, RuPaul reveals the guest judges and tells the contestants that they must also present a musical adaptation of Comedy Central's Strangers with Candy. As the winner of the mini-challenge, Chi Chi DeVayne is in charge of choreography. The contestants rehearse choreography on the main stage, then return to working on their outfits in the workroom. Derrick Barry and Naomi Smalls continue to argue.

On elimination day, the contestants make final preparations for the fashion show. Naomi Smalls assists Derrick Barry with her makeup; the two also talk about Derrick Barry's relationship with her mother. On the main stage, RuPaul welcomes fellow judges Michelle Visage and Ross Mathews, as well as guest judges Amy and David Sedaris. RuPaul shares the assignment, then the contestants perform to the song. The fashion show commences and the contestants present their looks. The judges deliver their critiques, deliberate, then share the results with the group. Kim Chi is declared the winner of the main challenge. Bob the Drag Queen and Derrick Barry place in the bottom and face off in a lip-sync contest to "You Make Me Feel (Mighty Real)" (1978) by Sylvester. Bob the Drag Queen wins the lip-sync and Derrick Barry is eliminated from the competition.

== Production and broadcast ==
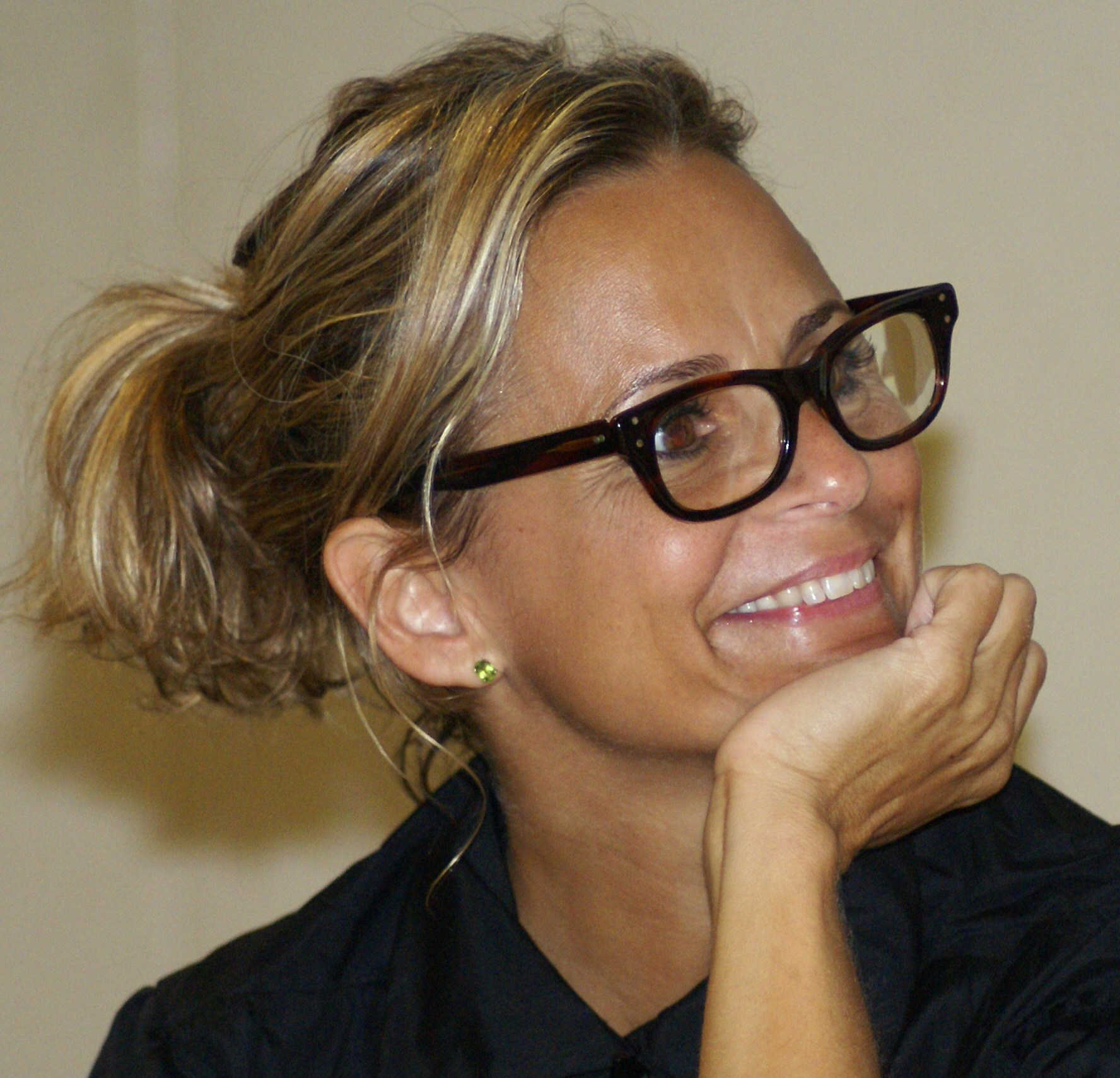
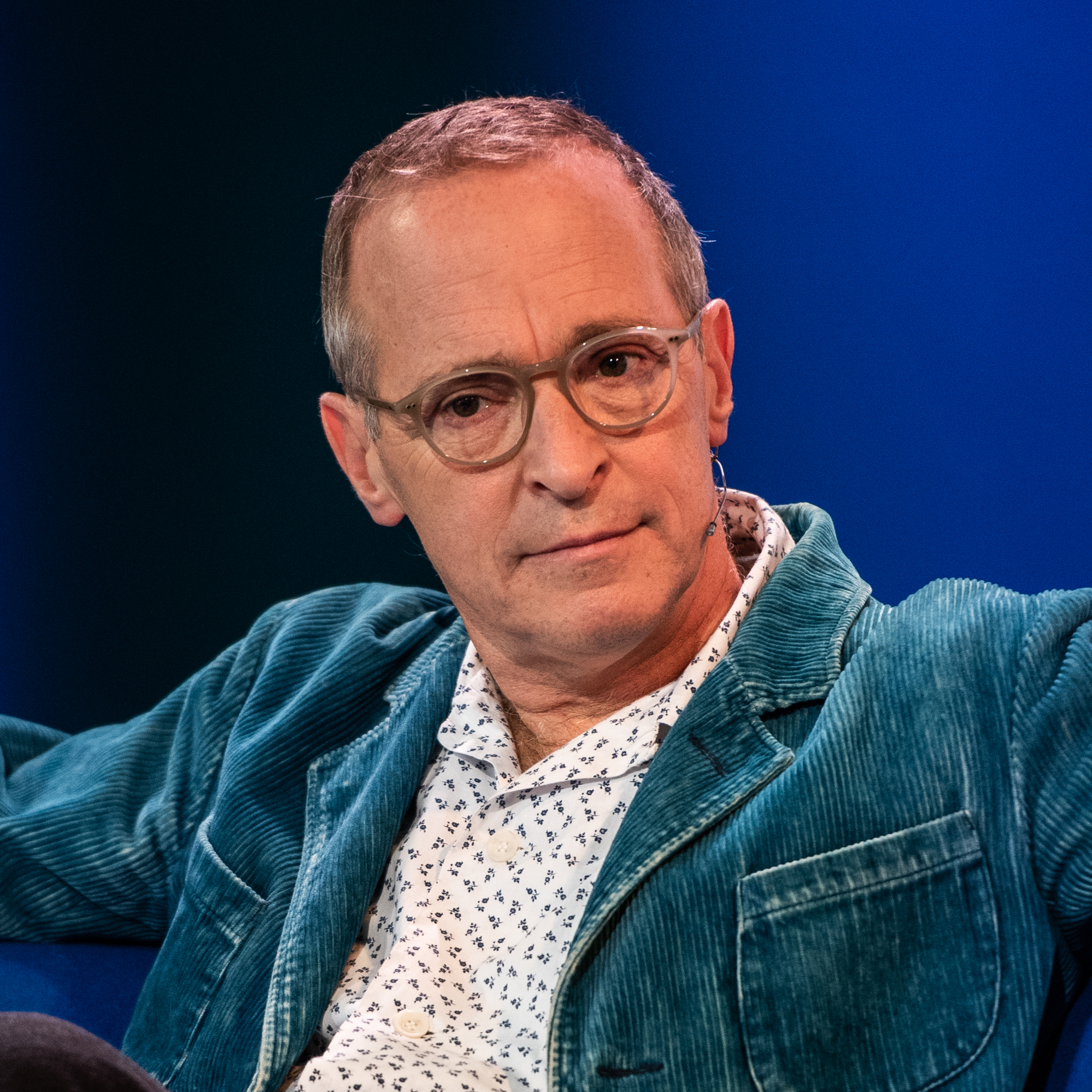
Siblings Amy (top) and David Sedaris (bottom) are guest judges.

The episode originally aired on April 25, 2016.

=== Fashion ===
For the first runway category ("Baby Drag Realness"), each of the contestants wear oversized red high-heeled shoes. Kim Chi wears a blue dress and a large pearl necklace. Naomi Smalls has a pacifier in her mouth and she wears a diaper and a head wrap. Bob the Drag Queen's outfit has an animal print and she also wears a large pearl necklace. Inspired by Ariel from The Little Mermaid, Derrick Barry has a long blue dress and a red wig. Chi Chi DeVayne wears a long purple dress and red glasses.

For "That's My Mama Realness", Kim Chi wears a pink-and-white traditional Korean dress. Naomi Smalls has a long white dress and she carries two dolls. Bob the Drag Queen wears a suit and a short dark wig. Derrick Barry has a long light blue dress and a long dark wig. Chi Chi DeVayne's outfit has an animal print. She also has large earrings and short wig.

For "Autobiographical Eleganza Extravaganza", Kim Chi has a white outfit with green accents, and a pink wig. Naomi Smalls has a short white dress and a long blonde wig. Bob the Drag Queen's outfit is blue and yellow. She has blue high-heels and a dark wig. Derrick Barry has a corset, pink gloves, and a red wig. Chi Chi DeVayne has a short white dress and a long ponytail.

== Reception ==
Oliver Sava of The A.V. Club gave the episode a rating of 'A'. Gay Times included Chi Chi DeVayne's runway presentation in the episode among her "most sickening moments" on the show. Screen Rant included Kim Chi's book look in a 2021 overview of the show's best ball challenge outfits, and said: "Kim Chi's stunning flower headpiece and her accompanying gown were awe-inspiring, especially when considering the look is made out of pages from a book. With a beautiful silhouette and an appreciable construction, Kim Chi's Book Couture gown and headpiece were an amazing example of how unconventional materials can create a fantastic look."

Kevin O'Keeffe ranked the "You Make Me Feel (Mighty Real)" performance number 21 in INTO Magazine's 2018 "definitive ranking" of the show's lip-sync contests to date. Sam Brooks ranked the contest number 75 in The Spinoff's 2019 "definitive ranking" of the show's 162 lip-syncs to date.
