= Jason-Shane Scott =

American actor (born 1976)

- Born: December 29, 1976 (age 49); California, U.S.
- Occupation: Actor
- Years active: 1996–present
- Spouse(s): Caroline Pearce (2024-present)

Jason-Shane Scott (born December 29, 1976) is an American actor.

== Life and career ==
Scott was born in Southern California. At the age of two he moved to Reno, Nevada with his mother and older sister while making frequent trips to Los Angeles to visit his father. Scott attended Wooster High School and excelled at sports, playing baseball, basketball and football. His football talent earned him particular recognition; his team won the state championship and Scott himself was offered numerous football scholarships. Upon graduation, Scott chose to pursue an acting career and moved back to Los Angeles. Enrolled in acting classes, he began studying intensely. He also took up modeling and spent several months in Europe.

Upon his return to the United States, he appeared in such films as Shrieker, Until Death, A Turn in the Tree, Caught and Billy's Hollywood Screen Kiss, as well as the Aerosmith videos for "Love Is Hard on your Knees" and "Hole in My Soul". In 1998 he tested for and won the role of troubled teenager Will Rappaport on the daytime serial One Life to Live and moved to New York City. For this portrayal, he received two Soap Opera Digest Award nominations: 1999, Outstanding Male Newcomer; 2000, Outstanding Younger Leading Actor. Scott's three years on OLTL allowed him to polish his acting further as he was given a chain of challenging storylines. In 2001, he left OLTL and New York and returned to Los Angeles. Since then, he has appeared in such films as Wolves of Wall Street (2003), Latter Days (2004) and Starship Troopers 2: Hero of the Federation (2004) and guest starred on such shows as the Lifetime drama For the People (2002), NBC's Scrubs and CBS's CSI: Crime Scene Investigation. Scott has also made a few brief returns to One Life to Live since his departure in 2001, most recently in September 2007. He has appeared on CBS's The Young and the Restless and has co-starred with Brittany Powell in Soapnet's One Minute Soap titled "Too Late". In 2024 Jason joined the Call of Duty franchise by portraying Jackson Caine in Call of Duty:Black Ops 6. Caine is an operator in the game and a mysterious main character for the campaign.

Jason-Shane Scott is married to Caroline Pearce. They married on September 1, 2024, according to his Instagram post. They had a wedding in Tuscany.

== Filmography ==
=== Film ===
Year	Title	Role	Notes
1996	Caught	-	
1998	Billy's Hollywood Screen Kiss	Brad	
1998	Shrieker	Orderly #1	
1998	Curse of the Puppet Master	Deputy Wayburn	Video
2002	Wolves of Wall Street	Meeks	
2003	Latter Days	Christian's Sublet	
2004	Starship Troopers 2: Hero of the Federation	Private Duff Horton	Video
2005	The Dying Gaul	Robert's Masseuse	
2005	Dirty Deeds	Boyfriend	
2009	Deadland	Krannen	
2009	Stem Cell	Pierce	
2009	The Pit and the Pendulum	Julian	
2009	Nightfall	Teacher	
2011	Le Cheapeau	Homme	
2011	Amy Alyson Fans	Kevin	
2012	Walking the Halls	Max	
2012	Snow White: A Deadly Summer	Mark	
2012	Return of the Killer Shrews	Sam	
2013	All I Want for Christmas	Drew Korzo	TV movie
2014	Red Sky	Vegas	
2014	Devilish Charm	Paul	
2014	Such Good People	Johnny	
2015	Christmas Land	Mitchell	TV movie
2016	The Wrong Roommate	Alan	TV movie
2016	Sniper: Special Ops	Tyler	
2016	Accidental Switch	Richard Williams	TV movie
2016	A Husband for Christmas	Agent Nathan Hedge	TV movie
2017	The Wrong Student	Dominic	TV movie
2017	The Sandman	Colton	
2017	Framed by My Fiancé	Daniel Hackett	TV movie
2017	Delivering Christmas	Tom	Short
2017	Deadly Exchange	Scott	TV movie
2018	Murder at the Mansion	Karl	TV movie
2018	The Wrong Teacher	Scott	TV movie
2019	The Wrong Boy Next Door	Franklin	TV movie
2019	The Wrong Mommy	Alex	TV movie
2019	The Wrong Tutor	Coach Lerner	TV movie
2020	The Wrong Housesitter	Dan	TV movie
2020	Fatal Affair	Travis	
2021	The Wrong Fiancé	Richard	TV movie
2021	Abduction Runs in the Family	Grant Bradshaw	TV movie
2025	A Christmas Murder Mystery	Darren Caldwell	TV movie

2024 - "Call of Duty:Black Ops 6" Jackson Caine

=== Television ===
Year	Title	Role	Notes
1998-2007	One Life to Live	Will Rappaport	Regular Cast
2001	Say What? Karaoke	Himself	Episode: "March 25, 2001"
2002	For the People	Duncan Lorry	Episode: "Pawns"
2004	Charmed	Dream Guy	Episode: "Prince Charmed"
2004	The Young and the Restless	Chad Gibson	Episode: "Episode #1.7965"
2004	Scrubs	Mike	Episode: "Her Story"
2006	CSI: Crime Scene Investigation	Ahren	Episode: "Daddy's Little Girl"
2006	Pepper Dennis	Rick Harper	Episode: "Heiress Bridenapped"
2006	Desperate Housewives	Tad	Episode: "It Takes Two"
2013	Anger Management	Couple Man #5	Episode: "Charlie and Kate Start a Sex Study"
2013	Conan	Superman	Episode: "The Fast & Dealing-With-Their-Fury-Through-Journaling 6"
2014	Mixology	Maya's 2008 Boyfriend	Episode: "Tom & Maya II"
2014	Grey's Anatomy	Dr. Roberts	Episode: "Everything I Try to Do, Nothing Seems to Turn Out Right"
2014-17	The Bay	Brad	Recurring Cast: Season 1 & 3
2015	Queens of Drama	Himself	Main Cast
2017	Famous in Love	Brody	Episode: "Pilot" & "A Star Is Torn"
2022	Dead to Me	Shirtless Man	Episode: "We've Been Here Before"
2023	The Rookie: Feds	Marcus	Episode: "For Love and Money"
