= Jenya Lano =

Russian-Italian actress and comedian (born 1978)

- Born: Jenya Lano; October 7, 1978 (age 47); Moscow, Soviet Union
- Occupations: Actress, writer, voice over artist
- Years active: 1998–present

Jenya Lano (Russian: Же́ня Уилсон Ла́но) (Moscow, October 7, 1978) is a Russian-Italian actress and comedian, best known for her recurring role as Inspector Sheridan in ten episodes of the American television series Charmed.

== Career ==
Raised in Moscow and Rome, Lano is fluent in English, Russian and Italian.

Lano made her debut in the 1998 film Shrieker. She also made appearances in Blade, S.W.A.T., Ghost Rock, Stealing Candy and Fashionably L.A., as well guest starring in the TV series The Shield, Xena: Warrior Princess and NCIS. In 2004 she voiced the character of Xenia Onatopp in the video game GoldenEye: Rogue Agent.

== Filmography ==
=== Film ===
Year	Title	Role	Notes
1998	Shrieker	Elaine	
1998	Blade	Russian Woman	
1999	Fashionably L.A.	Tatiana	
2002	New Suit	Barbie	
2003	Stealing Candy	Candy Tyler	
2003	The Five Stages of Beer	Audrey	
2003	S.W.A.T.	Monique	
2003	Ghost Rock	Savanah Starr	
2004	Jam	Lilac	Short
2005	Erosion	Sally	
2005	Killing Cupid	Valentine	
2006	Ten 'til Noon	Miss Milch	

=== Television ===
Year	Title	Role	Notes
1998	Players	Thelma	"Mint Condition"
1998	Just Shoot Me!	Kimmy	"Sewer!"
1998	Air America	Natalie	"Betrayal"
1999	Xena: Warrior Princess	Mavican	"Succession"
2000	G vs E	Billy Rollo	"Ambulance Chaser"
2000	Diagnosis: Murder	Warrant Off. Hannah Bernstein	"Murder at BBQ Bob's"
2000	Blood Money	Chloe Beck	TV film
2002	Off Centre	Julie	"Faking the Band"
2002	The Shield	Adriana	"The Spread"
2003	Mutant X	Nikki Rodgers	"Understudy"
2003	Deathlands: Homeward Bound	Krysty Wroth	TV film
2004	NCIS	Carol Powers	"Missing"
2004-05	Charmed	Inspector Sheridan / Avatar	Recurring role (Seasons 6-7/8 E 10 (uncredited)
