= Andrew Christian =

American men's underwear, swimwear, and sportswear manufacturer

Andrew Christian - International
- Type: Private
- Industry: Fashion
- Founded: 2001; 25 years ago
- Founder: Andrew Christian, Jeff White
- Defunct: December 2, 2025
- Headquarters: Glendale, California, United States
- Area served: Worldwide
- Products: Men's swimwear, skincare, sportswear, underwear, and clothing
- Website: andrewchristian.com

Andrew Christian was an American men's underwear, swimwear, sportswear and lingerie manufacturer named after its founder, Andrew Christian.

== History ==
Andrew Christian started the clothing line in 1997. He sold his clothing in boutiques. He chose a generic cross icon for his logo as he wanted to avoid religious connotations.

The regular fashions were followed, over the years, by sportswear, swimwear, and then underwear, "and that's when things really took off." In 2006, with the addition of the underwear lines, sales grew exponentially.

In the 2007/2008 season the company produced Barack Obama-themed underwear, donating $1 from every sale to the 2008 Barack Obama presidential campaign.

In 2008 Christian released Black Line, "a higher end dressy line of men's wear," inspired by the clothes he made for himself, and features ready-to-wear tailored pants and vests.

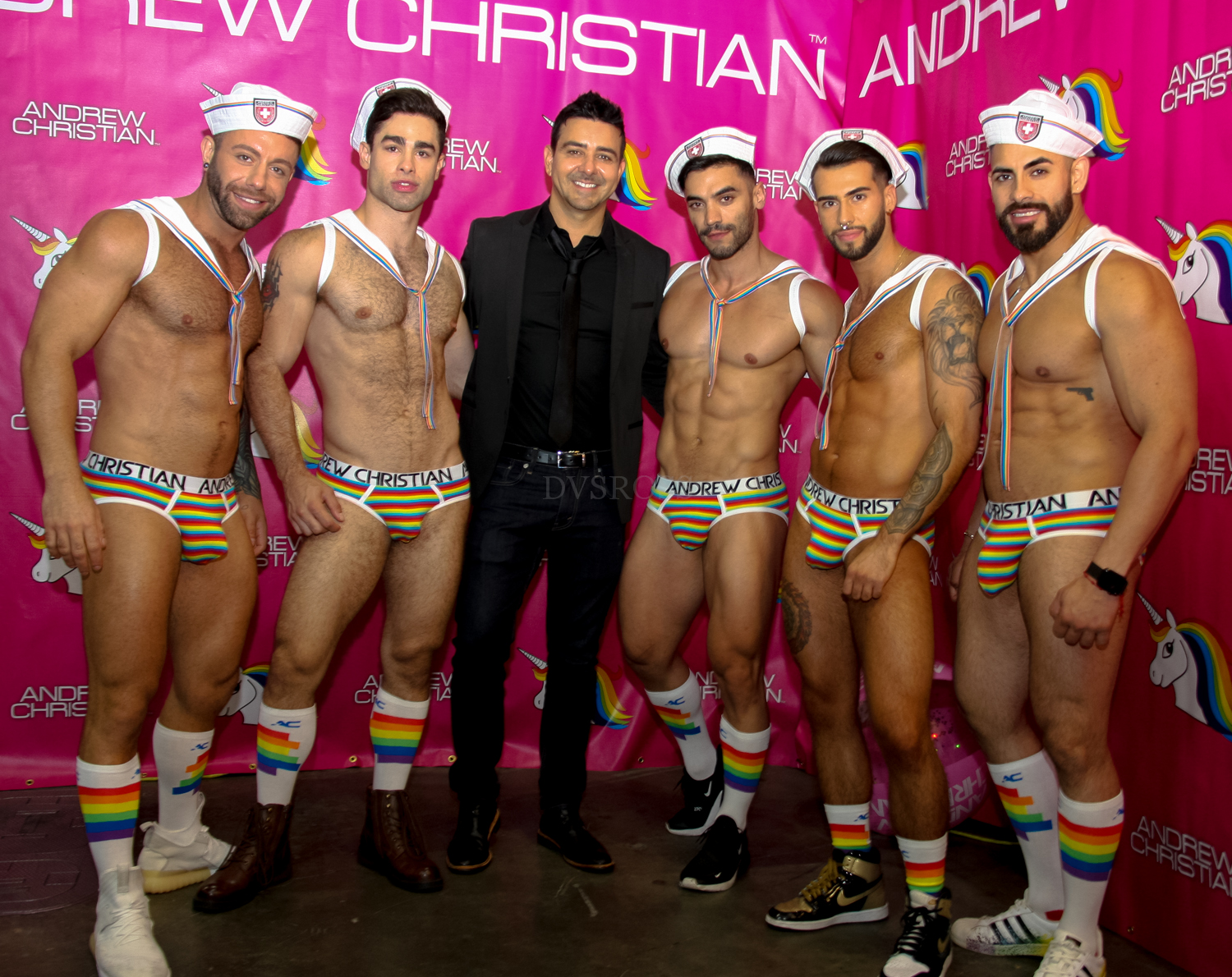
Andrew Christian with underwear models at RuPaul's DragCon LA 2019

In the 2008/2009 season the company started making clothes for women as well as men. In 2013 it expanded the sportswear lines.

In June 2025, Christian announced that he would be shutting down the brand and retiring by the end of the year.
