= The Wrong... (film series) =

American television thriller film series

- Written by: Matthew Jason Walsh (1–4); Robert Dean Klein (5, 8, 11, 20, 22, 25–27); Nick Everhart (6); Adam Rockoff (7, 10, 12–19, 21, 23, 28–30); Michael Varrati (9); Rolfe Kanefsky (19); Lark Bunker (24)
- Story by: Peter Sullivan (3–6, 9, 11–14, 17, 20–22, 24, 26, 29–30); Jeffrey Schenck (3–6, 9, 11–14, 17, 20–22, 24, 26, 29–30)
- Directed by: David DeCoteau
- Starring: Vivica A. Fox
- Composers: Sandro Morales Santoro (1); Nick Soole (2); Christopher Cano (3–29); Chris Ridenhour (6, 9, 12–23, 27–28)
- Country of origin: United States
- Original language: English

Production
- Executive producers: Barry Barnholtz; Zelma Kiwi (1–8, 10–27, 29); Jeffrey Schenck; David DeCoteau (3); Vivica A. Fox (10–11, 22, 26)
- Producers: David DeCoteau (1–2, 4–9, 12–13); Vivica A. Fox (2–9, 12–15, 17–21, 24, 29); Charles Arthur Berg (4, 8)
- Cinematography: Howard Wexler (1–2); Thomas L. Callaway (3–4, 7); Robert Hayes (5); Ben Demaree (6); Terrance Ryker (8–13)
- Editors: Randy Carter (1–2, 5–7, 11, 21); Brian Brinkman (3–4, 8–10, 12–13, 17); Joshua Toomey (3–4, 13, 17); Spenser Reich (12); Kevin Rhoades (14–16, 19–20, 22); Jo Martin (23); Rusty Olson (26–29)
- Running time: 2,506 minutes
- Production companies: Hybrid Films; Rapid Heart Pictures (1–2)

Original release
- Network: Lifetime
- Release: January 3, 2016 – present

The Wrong... is an American television thriller television film series starring and produced by Vivica A. Fox for Lifetime. The series is produced by Hybrid Films and directed by David DeCoteau. Thirty movies have been produced since 2016. Some of the other notable actors in the series include Jason-Shane Scott, Jessica Morris, Tracy Nelson, Dominique Swain, and Eric Roberts.

A spin-off series, Keeping Up with the Joneses, also starring Fox, premiered on LMN in 2021.

== Films ==
All films in the series have been directed by David DeCoteau, and are executive produced by and feature Vivica A. Fox.

No.	Title	Written by	Original release date
1	The Wrong Roommate	Matthew Jason Walsh	January 3, 2016
Starring: Jessica Morris, Vivica A. Fox, Jason-Shane Scott, Dominique Swain, Eric Roberts
2	The Wrong Child	Matthew Jason Walsh	June 26, 2016
Starring: Vivica A. Fox, Tracy Nelson, Gary Daniels
3	The Wrong Student	Matthew Jason Walsh	March 11, 2017
Starring: Jessica Morris, Evanne Friedmann, Jason-Shane Scott, Kennedy Tucker, Vivica A. Fox, William McNamara
4	The Wrong Crush	Matthew Jason Walsh, Jeffrey Schenck, Peter Sullivan	July 2, 2017
Starring: Ricardo Hoyos, Lesli Kay, Victoria Konefal, Meredith Thomas, Vivica A. Fox
5	The Wrong Man	Robert Dean Klein, Jeffrey Schenck, Peter Sullivan	December 29, 2017
Starring: Jessica Morris, Rib Hillis, Vivica A. Fox
6	The Wrong Cruise	Nick Everhart, Jeffrey Schenck, Peter Sullivan	July 28, 2018
Starring: Vivica A. Fox, Andres Londono, William McNamara, Dominique Swain, Sidney Nicole Rogers
7	The Wrong Friend	Adam Rockoff	September 14, 2018
Starring: Vivica A. Fox, Michael Paré, Tracy Nelson, Steve Richard Harris, Hilary Shepard
8	The Wrong Teacher	Robert Dean Klein	December 28, 2018
Starring: Jessica Morris, Jason-Shane Scott, Philip McElroy, Eric Roberts, Vivica A. Fox, Dominique Swain, Dee Wallace
9	The Wrong Stepmother	Michael Varrati, Jeffrey Schenck, Peter Sullivan	July 5, 2019
Starring: Vivica A. Fox, Cindy Busby, Corin Nemec, Tracy Nelson
10	The Wrong Boy Next Door	Adam Rockoff	July 12, 2019
Starring: Vivica A. Fox, Calli Taylor, Travis Burns, Jason-Shane Scott
11	The Wrong Mommy	Robert Dean Klein, Jeffrey Schenck, Peter Sullivan	July 19, 2019
Starring: Vivica A. Fox, Jessica Morris, Ashlynn Yennie, Jason-Shane Scott, Dee Wallace, Eric Roberts, Dominique Swain
12	The Wrong Tutor	Adam Rockoff	July 26, 2019
Starring: Vivica A. Fox, Nate Wyatt, Ivy Matheson, Jackée Harry, William McNamara
13	The Wrong Cheerleader	Adam Rockoff	September 8, 2019
Starring: Vivica A. Fox, Cristine Prosperi, David Meza
14	The Wrong Housesitter	Adam Rockoff	January 24, 2020
Starring: Vivica A. Fox, Anna Marie Dobbins, Jason-Shane Scott, Tracy Nelson
15	The Wrong Wedding Planner	Adam Rockoff	January 24, 2020
Starring: Vivica A. Fox, Yan-Kay Crystal Lowe, Stephen Richardson, Kristin Booth, Jackée Harry
16	The Wrong Stepfather	Adam Rockoff	July 31, 2020
Starring: Vivica A. Fox, Krista Allen, William McNamara
17	The Wrong Cheerleader Coach	Adam Rockoff	October 17, 2020
Starring: Vivica A. Fox, Corin Nemec, Tara Reid, Johanna Liauw
18	The Wrong Real Estate Agent	Adam Rockoff	January 1, 2021
Starring: Vivica A. Fox, Andres Londono, Alaya Lee Walton, Dorian Gregory
19	The Wrong Fiancé	Adam Rockoff	January 8, 2021
Starring: Vivica A. Fox, Jessica Morris, Jason-Shane Scott, Lesli Kay, Hilary Shepard, Michael Paré
20	The Wrong Mr. Right	Robert Dean Klein, Jeffrey Schenck, Peter Sullivan	January 15, 2021
Starring: Vivica A. Fox, Anna Marie Dobbins, Krista Allen, Steve Richard Harris, Dominique Swain, Eric Roberts
21	The Wrong Prince Charming	Adam Rockoff	January 22, 2021
Starring: Vivica A. Fox, James Nitti, Cristine Prosperi, Tracy Nelson
22	The Wrong Valentine	Robert Dean Klein, Jeffrey Schenck, Peter Sullivan	February 11, 2021
Starring: Vivica A. Fox, Mariah Robinson, Meredith Thomas
23	The Wrong Cheer Captain	Adam Rockoff	August 29, 2021
Starring: Vivica A. Fox, Alexis Samone, Jackée Harry
24	The Wrong Blind Date	Lark Bunker	January 14, 2022
Starring: Vivica A. Fox, Meredith Thomas, Matthew Pohlkamp
25	The Wrong High School Sweetheart	Robert Dean Klein	February 4, 2022
Starring: Vivica A. Fox, Mea Wilkerson, Eric Roberts, Tracy Nelson, Jeremy Meeks
26	The Wrong Life Coach	Robert Dean Klein	January 11, 2024
Starring: Vivica A. Fox, Allison McAtee, Morgan Bradley, Tracy Nelson, Michael Paré, Eric Roberts, Jamie Bernadette
27	The Wrong Obsession	Robert Dean Klein	February 21, 2025
Starring: Vivica A. Fox, Gina Hiraizumi, Matthew Pohlkamp, Daniel Joo, Morgan Bradley, Diane Robin
28	The Wrong Marriage	Adam Rockoff	June 26, 2025
Starring: Vivica A. Fox, Alicia Mason, Hector David Jr., Jackée Harry, Jeremiah Blakely, Jamie Bernadette
29	The Wrong Baby Daddy	Adam Rockoff, Jeffrey Schenck, Peter Sullivan	February 13, 2026
Starring: Vivica A. Fox, Ciarra Carter, Matthew Pohlkamp, Jamie Bernadette, Sam Schweikert, Jon Briddell
30	The Wrong Housemaid	Adam Rockoff, Jeffrey Schenck, Peter Sullivan	August 28, 2026
Starring: Vivica A. Fox, April Hale, Demetris Owens Jr., Grace Field, Matthew Pohlkamp, Michael Paré

The Wrong House, starring Clare Kramer, Tilky Jones, Allison McAtee and Thomas Calabro, and which premiered on Lifetime on December 26, 2016, was directed by Sam Irvin and does not feature Vivica A. Fox. Similarly, The Wrong Neighbor, starring Michael Madsen, Andrea Bogart, Steve Richard Harris, Cristine Prosperi and Ashlynn Yennie, was also directed by Irvin and Fox does not feature in the film, premiered on Lifetime on June 26, 2017. Both films are not part of The Wrong film series but simply titled "The Wrong..." being produced by Hybrid Films and have often been subsequently retitled by Lifetime for rebroadcast.

== Keeping Up with the Joneses ==
Keeping Up with the Joneses
- Genre: Drama
- Created by: Adam Rockoff
- Starring: Vivica A. Fox; Arie Thompson; Jasmine Aivaliotis; Shellie Sterling; Ciarra Carter; Kandi Burruss
- Composers: Christopher Cano; Chris Ridenhour
- Country of origin: United States
- Original language: English
- No. of seasons: 2
- No. of episodes: 7

Production
- Executive producers: Barry Barnholtz; Jeffrey Schenck; Zelma Kiwi
- Producer: Vivica A. Fox
- Production company: Hybrid

Original release
- Network: LMN
- Release: July 8, 2021 – July 29, 2022

Keeping Up with the Joneses is an American limited drama television series created by Adam Rockoff and starring Vivica A. Fox as Robin Jones, the second wife of Theodore Jones who assumed control of the family business after his death. Her four stepdaughters oppose her. The series premiered on July 8, 2021 on LMN, with the second season debuting the following year. All episodes were directed by David DeCoteau. Arie Thompson, Jasmine Aivaliotis, Shellie Sterling and Ciarra Carter starred as the stepdaughters, while Kandi Burruss served as narrator. Ted McGinley, Michael Paré, Marcos James, Carmel Fisher and Eric Roberts also appeared as series regulars.

=== Cast ===
- Vivica A. Fox as Robin Jones
- Arie Thompson as Pam Jones
- Jasmine Aivaliotis as Tara Jones
- Shellie Sterling as Kayla Jones
- Ciarra Carter as Carrie Jones
- Kandi Burruss as Narrator
- Ted McGinley as Webb
- Michael Paré as Sheldon
- Marcos James as William
- Carmel Fisher as Janet
- Eric Roberts as Leo
- Lesli Kay as Captain O'Neill
- Paul Logan as Brick
