= Starship Troopers 2: Hero of the Federation =

2004 film by Phil Tippett

- Promotional release poster
- Based on: Starship Troopers by Robert A. Heinlein
- Written by: Edward Neumeier
- Directed by: Phil Tippett
- Starring: Richard Burgi; Lawrence Monoson; Colleen Porch
- Music by: John W. Morgan; William T. Stromberg
- Country of origin: United States
- Original language: English

Production
- Producer: Jon Davison
- Cinematography: Christian Sebaldt
- Editor: Louise Rubacky
- Running time: 92 minutes
- Production companies: TriStar Pictures; StarTroop Pictures, Inc.; Jon Davison Productions
- Budget: $7 million

Original release
- Network: Encore Action
- Release: April 24, 2004

Related
- Starship Troopers (1997); Starship Troopers 3: Marauder (2008)

Starship Troopers 2: Hero of the Federation is a 2004 American military science fiction horror film directed by Phil Tippett and starring Richard Burgi, Lawrence Monoson, and Colleen Porch. It is a sequel to Starship Troopers (1997) and the second installment in the Starship Troopers franchise. The film premiered on Encore Action on April 24, 2004, and was released on DVD and VHS on June 1, 2004. The film received generally negative reviews from critics, who criticized the shift from the first film's action to horror, as well as the lack of returning cast from the first film. It was followed by the direct-to-video sequel Starship Troopers 3: Marauder in 2008.

== Plot ==
A squad of Federation troops and psychic soldiers find themselves pinned down on a planet overrun by Arachnids. General Jack Shepherd (Ed Lauter) makes a last stand with four of his best soldiers, allowing the majority of his surviving troops to escape, including Sergeant Dede Rake (Brenda Strong), psychic Lieutenant Pavlov Dill (Lawrence Monoson), Private Jill Sandee (Sandrine Holt), her lover Private Duff Horton (Jason-Shane Scott), Private Billie Otter (Cy Carter) and psychic Private Lei Sahara (Colleen Porch).

The survivors take shelter at an abandoned structure containing the disgraced Captain V. J. Dax (Richard Burgi), who killed his commanding officer and was left for dead. Despite reaching relative safety, the team is whittled down by dust storms and arachnid ambushes, leaving them without communications or back-up. Meanwhile, Dill is plagued by visions of the Arachnids annihilating humanity, hindering his efforts to lead the team, and he takes his anger out on Sahara, who lost reliable control of her abilities during puberty. Dax assumes command from Dill after deeming him an incompetent leader.

Soon after defenses are set up, the survivors are surprised to be met by a still-living General Shepherd, accompanied by three soldiers who rescued him from the slaughter – the comatose private Charlie Soda (Kelly Carlson), the strange-acting technical sergeant Ari Peck (J. P. Manoux), and the medic corporal Joe Griff (Ed Quinn). With the newcomers' help, the group restores communication, and waits for a fleet dropship to rescue them.

Several survivors, including Horton and Sandee, soon begin acting strangely. Sahara seems to have become ill, suffering nightmares and waking up vomiting; later, she accidentally brushes Griff's hand and has a psychic vision. She goes to Rake for advice and Rake suggests that Sahara is pregnant, which can cause visions if either parent or child is psychic. Eventually Sahara and Dax find themselves facing a new breed of Arachnid that infests the human body by entering through the mouth and propagating inside the brain. They go with the news to a guilt-ridden Dill, haunted by the many deaths under his command during the escape, and make amends with him, after which he confesses to the horrific visions he suffered having driven his prior poor decisions. Sahara tells Dill that she has been receiving parts of the vision as well, and Dill tells Sahara that an occasional side-effect of pregnancy can cause a temporary return of psychic abilities.

Soon after making amends, Dill finds General Shepard has also been infected. Dill attempts to capture Soda along with several infected soldiers to be dissected and studied but an infected Otter kills him with a knife that Dax had signed and given him; the murder is blamed on Dax and he is detained.

Rake is ambushed and infected by Horton and Otter, the latter also attempts to infect Sahara but is caught and killed. Rake takes multiple adrenaline shots to hamper her control bug long enough to wound Sandee, kill Horton, save Sahara and Dax, and kill herself. Sahara uses her restored psychic abilities to read the mind of the Arachnid that infected Rake and discovers their plan to use Shepherd to sabotage the Federation from within and wipe out the human race. Sahara and Dax kill the rest of the infected troops, confronting the infected Shepherd on the roof just as the pulse fences fail. Shepherd is about to be rescued when Dax arrives and kills him. Dax gets Sahara onto the ship, but believing "Murderers don't go home", he stays behind and sacrifices himself to the Arachnids.

One year later on Earth, Sahara – now discharged from federal service – attends a recruiting seminar with her newborn infant son to speak about her experience and of Dax's actions, crediting him for saving her life. Dax's last words, however, are altered by the Federation to hide his disgraced past and use his legacy as a means of recruitment. As Sahara leaves, the recruiting officer makes a morbid joke about her son's potential future fate, causing her to flee.

== Cast ==
- Richard Burgi as Capt. V.J. Dax
- Colleen Porch as Pvt. Lei Sahara
- Lawrence Monoson as Lt. Pavlov Dill
- Kelly Carlson as Pvt. Charlie Soda
- Brenda Strong as Sgt. Dede Rake. Strong played Captain Deladier in the first film.
- Ed Lauter as Gen. Jack Gordon Shepherd
- Sandrine Holt as Pvt. Jill Sandee
- Jason-Shane Scott as Pvt. Duff Horton
- Brian Tee as Cpl. Thom Kobe
- J. P. Manoux as TSgt. Ari Peck
- Ed Quinn as Cpl. Joe Griff
- Billy Brown as Pvt. Ottis Brick
- Cy Carter as Pvt. Billie Otter
- Drew Powell as Pvt. Kipper Tor
- David Wells as Recruiting Sergeant
- Stephen Stanton as Fednet (voice)

== Reception ==
=== Critical response ===
On Rotten Tomatoes the film has an approval rating of 33% based on 6 reviews. Andy Patrizio of IGN gave the film a "mediocre" rating, writing: "Movies like this are why direct-to-video has yet to earn any respectability and is viewed as the home for bad movies".

=== Accolades ===
The film won the award for Best DVD Release at the 31st Saturn Awards in 2005.

== Sequel ==
A sequel titled Starship Troopers 3: Marauder, was released in 2008.
