= Prank My Mom =

American comedy television series

- Genre: Comedy; Improv; Sketch
- Starring: Vivica A. Fox
- Country of origin: United States
- No. of seasons: 1
- No. of episodes: 15

Production
- Executive producers: Peter M. Cohen; Adam Freeman; Jon Pepper
- Running time: 20 to 24 minutes (excluding commercials)
- Production company: Peter M. Cohen Productions

Original release
- Network: Lifetime
- Release: September 27 – November 6, 2012

Prank My Mom is an American comedy television series on Lifetime. The series debuted on September 27, 2012 and was hosted by Vivica A. Fox.

== Premise ==
The television series is a Lifetime half-an-hour comedy show that provides centers around mothers being pranked by their children, by being unknowingly put in funny situations.

== Cast ==
- Vivica A. Fox
- Eliot Schwartz
- Alexandra Kirr
- Shelagh Ratner

== Production ==
The series was produced by Thinkfactory Media and Peter M. Cohen Productions. The series was executive produced by Adam Reed, Cohen, Adam Freeman, Leslie Greif Rob Sharenow, Gena McCarthy and Kimberly Chessler.

== Episodes ==
No.	Title	Original release date
1	"Episode 1"	September 27, 2012
2	"Episode 2"	October 6, 2012
3	"Episode 3"	October 9, 2012
4	"Episode 4"	October 12, 2012
5	"Episode 5"	October 16, 2129
6	"Episode 6"	October 19, 2012
7	"Episode 7"	October 22, 2012
8	"Episode 8"	October 26, 2012
9	"Episode 9"	October 27, 2012
10	"Episode 10"	November 2, 2012
11	"Episode 11"	November 4, 2012
12	"Episode 12"	November 4, 2012
13	"Episode 13"	November 5, 2012
14	"Episode 14"	November 5, 2012
15	"Episode 15"	November 6, 2012
