= Ann Atwater =

American civil rights activist (1935–2016)

- Atwater in 1995
- Born: July 1, 1935; Hallsboro, North Carolina, US
- Died: June 20, 2016 (aged 80); Durham, North Carolina, US
- Occupation: Civil rights activist
- Spouses: French Wilson (m. 1949; div. 1953) Willie Pettiford (m. 1975)
- Children: 2

Ann George Atwater (July 1, 1935 – June 20, 2016) was an American civil rights activist in Durham, North Carolina. Throughout her career, she helped improve the quality of life in Durham through programs such as Operation Breakthrough, a community organization dedicated to fight the War on Poverty. She became an effective activist and leader when advocating for black rights, such as better private housing. Atwater promoted unity of the working-class African Americans through grassroots organizations.

She is best known as one of the co-chairs of a charrette in 1971 to reduce school violence and ensure peaceful school desegregation. It met for ten sessions. She showed that it was possible for White and Black people, even with conflicting views, to negotiate and collaborate by establishing some common ground.

== Early life ==
Ann Atwater was born in 1935 in Hallsboro, North Carolina, one of nine children to sharecropper parents; her father also served as a deacon of the church. Growing up in poverty, she worked on farms alongside her siblings to support the family and experienced racial discrimination from a young age. In the documentary An Unlikely Friendship, Atwater recalled that while working on a white owner's farm, she was given food only through the back door and only after the white workers had eaten. She was taught that White people were superior and that their needs came before hers, learning to take second place.

At the age of fourteen, Atwater married 19-year-old French Elbert Wilson and moved with him to Durham in search of better economic opportunities. At the time, Durham was home to a sizable Black population, a considerable portion of which was educated and middle-class. The city's prosperous black business sector made Durham a beacon of hope for African Americans seeking to rise through self-help. However, poverty remained a significant problem in the segregated society; in 1950, 28% of families lived below the designated poverty line of $3,000. Poor Black residents of Durham had to face both racial and class divisions, dealing with White people who claimed superiority and wealthier Black individuals who avoided associating with the lower class. These struggles helped shape Atwater’s future activism.

Atwater and Wilson's first child, a son named Jimmy, died shortly after birth. She later gave birth to two healthy daughters, Lydia Marie and Marilynn Denise. Wilson struggled financially, battled substance abuse disorder, and became abusive toward his family. Eventually, Atwater divorced him and raised her two daughters as a single mother. She survived on a meager $57 a month from welfare and struggled to pay rent despite working as a domestic laborer in white households. She made dresses for her daughters out of flour and rice bags and could afford only rice, cabbage, and fatback for meals.

Her home was in terrible condition. The bathroom faucets shot water so intensely that her children nicknamed it “Niagara Falls.” The roof had holes, the bathtub had fallen through the floor, and the house was so poorly wired that when the electricity was cut off for nonpayment, stomping on the floor could make the lights flicker on and off. Atwater later joked that the house didn’t need windows—she could see everything happening on the streets through the cracks in the walls.

== Operation Breakthrough ==
When Howard Fuller approached her to join Operation Breakthrough, a program designed to help people escape poverty, Atwater found her life's purpose. Operation Breakthrough guided participants through a series of tasks to build a pattern of achievement, helping them gain confidence that they could create change and overcome poverty. Participants engaged in job-training, after-school tutoring, or education about their rights. The program was funded by the North Carolina Fund, a statewide initiative to improve education. Fuller met personally with each resident to understand their needs and help identify issues to be addressed, and he specifically requested that Atwater join the program. She soon became a Social Worker Associate and joined the organization's Board of Directors.

One day, when Atwater went to the welfare office to see if she could get $100 to pay her overdue rent and avoid eviction, she happened to meet Fuller. In 1967, Fuller encouraged her to take a hands-on class in community organizing, where she learned to help others facing similar challenges. The training prepared her to become a Community Action Technician. She showed Fuller her house, and he invited her to participate in his program. The next day, Atwater and Fuller went to her landlord to demand repairs, and to Atwater's surprise, her landlord agreed to fix some of the problems. She had never before realized that she could make such demands or that she had the right to do so. Afterwards, she attended an Operation Breakthrough meeting, where she discussed how the poor needed to work together to get the government's attention and address poverty, as well as her own concerns. That first meeting marked the beginning of her involvement in helping the poor Black community fight poverty.

Gradually, Atwater became a leader among participants in the Operation Breakthrough meetings. She began representing poor people with housing problems and went door-to-door, sharing her own experiences and explaining how she had resolved her own previous housing problems. She became an expert on housing policies, copying and distributing welfare regulation manuals so that people could learn their rights, including the right to demand that landlords repair substandard conditions. Atwater mobilized poor Black residents in Durham, helping them stand up for themselves. Her goal was to equip people with the skills they needed to survive and thrive.

By 1967, Atwater was working for the United Organization for Community Improvement, where she supervised the Neighborhood Workers Committee and chaired the Housing Committee. Backed by the North Carolina Fund, the organization helped Durham residents address issues such as food scarcity, voting rights, education, and housing. She also served on the Housing Committee of the Durham Committee on Negro Affairs, worked with Head Start and the Low Income Housing Development Corporation, and was elected vice president of the local Democratic Party in 1968.

Atwater fought against the lack of respect shown to Black people seeking welfare assistance, noting that some welfare workers were guilty of such behavior and often treated them poorly. She described how the office's open layout allowed workers to shout questions at Black clients from across the room, asking "What you here for?" and other personal questions that everyone could hear, while quietly calling white clients to the desk to ask them the same questions, such as "Your name, address?" and "What are you here for?.” She said this treatment was humiliating and disrespectful.

To address the problem, Atwater used the power of numbers: she organized groups of women who frequently visited the welfare offices to push for change. With her persistence and the support of other community activists working with her, the offices set up private booths for meetings with each client, allowing clients to be treated with more dignity during their interactions. Such a system is still in use today.

== Involvement in Durham charrette ==
In July 1971, public schools in Durham were still segregated, despite the 1954 U.S. Supreme Court ruling that declared segregated schools unconstitutional and the civil rights legislation of the 1960s requiring the integration of public facilities. The Durham federal district court had recently ordered desegregation of schools to comply with the Supreme Court ruling—an action still opposed by many residents. Schools were experiencing increasing racial tensions, with students anxious about the future and frequently getting into fights over the issue.

To manage the transition to racial integration, Councilman Bill Riddick called a charrette—a collaborative process consisting of ten days of town meetings designed to hear as many voices as possible and resolve issues related to implementing the court order. Riddick recruited participants from all sectors of Durham and invited Atwater to co-lead the charrette alongside C. P. Ellis, then the Exalted Grand Cyclops of the Durham Ku Klux Klan. Atwater and Ellis agreed to co-chair the charrette primarily to ensure that neither could have full control over the outcome.

Ellis had regularly attended city council, school board, and county meetings to oppose civil rights changes and activists. When Atwater first met C. P. Ellis at a Durham city council meeting, she felt deep resentment toward him. Ellis was known for making provocative and often inaccurate remarks that expressed his fears and prejudices against Black people. For example, he said “Blacks are taking over the city. They got all the good jobs and you’re all sittin’ here letting ‘em do it,” and he insisted that Black people should stay on the other side of the railroad because they "had no business in town."

Atwater initially declined to serve as co-chair but eventually agreed to work with Ellis, though she was reluctant. Ellis shared similar doubts, saying, "It was impossible. How could I work with her?" Over time, however, they began to recognize common concerns, including the fact that their children were ostracized because of their parents' collaboration. Both wanted their children to attend schools free of violence.

Ellis later said,

“Here we are, two people from the far end of the fence, having identical problems, except her being black and me being white…The amazing thing about it, her and I, up to that point, [had] cussed each other, bawled each other, we hated each other. Up to that point, we didn’t know each other. We didn’t know we had things in common.”

They discussed the hardships of raising children in poverty and worked to emphasize that their children's potential was equal to that of middle-class children.

Over time, the two former antagonists learned to work together and, to everyone’s astonishment, became good friends. Moving beyond race, they began to focus on other issues, such as the academic quality of Durham’s schools. Ellis came to understand that Black people were not suppressing poor White people and that both groups faced similar challenges. Atwater had encouraged Ellis to question his long-held beliefs about Black people. By the end of the charrette, Ellis had relinquished his leadership role in the KKK. Afterward, Atwater and Ellis continued collaborating to fight poverty and racism for the rest of their lives.

Together, Atwater and Ellis presented the school board with a list of recommendations from the charrette. They proposed giving students a larger voice in educational decisions by expanding the board to include two students from each of the major racial groups. They also recommended major changes to the school curriculum, such as increased instruction on handling racial violence, the creation of a group to discuss and resolve problems before they escalated, and the inclusion of textbooks written by African-American authors.

== Personality ==
According to C. P. Ellis, Ann Atwater had a deep, powerful voice and the ability to energize her audience. She became an effective leader, unafraid to express her opinions loudly and proudly. She was also willing to tell anyone to “go to hell” if she felt it was necessary. Ellis noted that her most effective method for getting people to listen was simply to “holler at them.” When she called a meeting, she meant business.

When they were enemies, it was reported that Atwater once pulled out a pocket knife and threatened to kill Ellis. In another instance, during a meeting with a councilman, Atwater recalled that when he ignored her points, she would hit him on the head, surprising him enough that he would pay attention afterward.

Atwater also expressed her opinions at city council meetings, which were composed entirely of white members. When the councilmen turned their chairs away from her to avoid listening, she physically turned the chairs back toward her, forcing them to face her. Her bold and assertive actions caught the councilmen off guard, leaving them no choice but to listen. While some people may have found her demanding and outspoken, these very qualities made her a successful activist and organizer.

== Later life ==
After co-leading the charrette, Atwater continued to work with the poor and middle-class Black community in Durham. In 1975, She married Willie Pettiford and became a deacon at the Mount Calvary United Church of Christ. She and Ellis maintained their friendship until the end of their lives.

From 2006 until her death, Atwater worked with Jonathan Wilson-Hartgrove at the School for Conversion as a "freedom teacher," mentoring young people and activists in community organizing and fusion politics. The school's Ann Atwater Freedom Library continues her work of "making surprising friendships possible".

Atwater died in Durham on June 20, 2016 at the age of 80.

== Legacy and honors ==
- 1967, she was recognized as Carolina Times Woman of the Year
- A book, Best of Enemies, was written about her unlikely friendship with C.P. Ellis. The book was adapted as a play of the same name, which premiered in Durham in 2013, and a 2019 movie of the same name.
- Durham mayor Bill Bell declared December 6, 2013 to be "Ann Atwater Day" in the city.
- Atwater was recognized alongside C. P. Ellis as main honorees by the Sesquicentennial Honors Commission at the Durham 150 Closing Ceremony in Durham, North Carolina, on November 2, 2019. The posthumous recognition was bestowed upon Atwater and Ellis for their contributions to the desegregation of Durham Public Schools in 1971.

== In popular culture ==
- Ann Atwater: Grassroots Organizer and Veteran of America’s Freedom Struggle (2002), is a documentary about her work as an activist.
- An Unlikely Friendship (2002) is a documentary about the friendship that developed between Atwater and C.P. Ellis, the head of the local Ku Klux Klan chapter.
- The feature film The Best of Enemies (2019) focuses on Atwater's role as an activist and co-chair of the charrette on solving public school issues. She is played by Taraji P. Henson; Sam Rockwell plays C. P. Ellis.
- Best of Friends, a stage play written by Mark St. Germain, portrays the story of Ann Atwater’s partnership with C. P. Ellis during the 1971 Durham school desegregation charrette. The play has been produced at regional theaters, including the Allens Lane Theatre in Philadelphia, where Atwater was portrayed by actress Zuhairah McGill.
