= C. P. Ellis =

American civil rights and trade union activist

- Ellis in 1995
- Born: Claiborne Paul Ellis; January 8, 1927; Durham, North Carolina, US
- Died: November 3, 2005 (aged 78); Durham, North Carolina, US
- Occupation: Trade union organizer

Claiborne Paul Ellis (January 8, 1927 – November 3, 2005) was an American segregationist turned civil rights activist and trade union organizer. Ellis was at one time Exalted Cyclops, local leader of a Ku Klux Klan group in Durham, North Carolina, the city where he was born.

== Early life ==
Ellis was born on January 8, 1927, and was raised in Durham, North Carolina, as the son of a mill worker. He was deeply influenced by his father, who was a member of the Ku Klux Klan. In his recorded memoir, he described his impoverished childhood and the worn clothes that he would wear to school. He would often feel embarrassed about how he and his father looked in public. Although his father drank, Ellis described the close relationship the two shared by going to ball games and fishing.

== Klan career ==
As he grew older, Ellis became disillusioned with the notion of the American dream. He worked for several years at a gas station before he got married and had four children. The financial strain of taking care of his wife and children (one of whom was blind and non-verbal) led him to what he described as the need to blame somebody. To him, it was natural to hate Black people because his father had participated in the Ku Klux Klan. He was invited by men he met while working at the gas station to join a local Klan group. He quickly became a very active member, climbing the ranks of leadership until his final pronouncement as Exalted Cyclops. Ellis attributed the elation of this period to the feelings of self-worth and the importance of being a respected member of this group.

Ellis began a youth group for children to indoctrinate them with the teachings of the Klan. He also felt that it would be appropriate for the Klan to become more politically active, as Black people were also openly demonstrating. He began to receive calls from city councilmen to show up at political events in order to combat the black presence. Ellis described a moment of clarity when a city councilman, whom he had spoken with on the phone the night before, crossed the street in order not to pass him on the sidewalk. At this point, he felt that the council neither respected the view of the Klan nor the Black people and that their interest had been only for themselves.

In 1971, the Durham City Schools faced considerable turmoil because of court-ordered desegregation. The state AFL–CIO received $78,000 in grant money by the Department of Health, Education, and Welfare to address the school system's racial policies. A community organizer, Bill Riddick, motivated by fears of violence among the students, organized a series of community meetings called a charrette, where the entire community came together to try to solve this problem. The first step was to create a steering committee that was representative of the community. Riddick invited Ann Atwater, an African American civil rights activist, and the segregationist Ellis to co-chair the meetings.

== Ideological change ==
After 10 days of talks, Ellis and Atwater became friends, and Ellis came to believe that white people, especially poor white people, could prosper more from the civil rights movement than from segregation. Atwater and Ellis came to know each other as individuals instead of as stereotypes. They came to see how they, as poor people, were both oppressed and that their children faced many of the same issues. It was during this time that they cried together.

During the charrette, gospel music was performed. Ellis could be seen clapping his hands and stomping his feet to the music. Atwater told how she had to teach Ellis how to clap because "White folks clap an odd beat". On the last night of the charrette, 1,000 people participated, including some of Ellis's fellow Klan members. At the microphone, Ellis held his Klan membership card up and said: "If schools are going to be better by me tearing up this card, I shall do so." Ellis thus renounced the Klan that night and never returned to it. The remaining Klansmen threatened his life and refused to talk to him again for the next 30 years. Ellis and Atwater formed an enduring friendship.

Ellis, having only an eighth-grade level education, went on to participate in a program called PEP (Past Employment Progress) and received his diploma. He also became heavily involved in union organization and was voted business manager of the union with a tally of 134 votes to 41 votes for the competition.

His conversion to advocacy for desegregation is conveyed in the book by Osha Gray Davidson, The Best of Enemies (1996), in the documentary An Unlikely Friendship, in an interview with Studs Terkel recorded in Terkel's book American Dreams (1980), in the 2011 play The Best of Enemies by Mark St. Germain, and in the 2019 film The Best of Enemies, in which he is portrayed by Sam Rockwell.

== Death ==
Ellis died of Alzheimer's disease in 2005, and Ann Atwater delivered a eulogy at his funeral.

== Posthumous recognition ==
On November 2, 2019, Ellis and Ann Atwater were posthumously recognized as Main Honorees by the Sesquicentennial Honors Commission at the Durham 150 Closing Ceremony in Durham, North Carolina for their contributions to the desegregation of Durham Public Schools in 1971.
