= Howard Fuller =

Howard Fuller may refer to:

- Howard Fuller (racing driver) (born 1992), British auto racer
- Howard Fuller (activist) (born 1941), American civil rights and black power activist and advocate of school vouchers
