= Howard Fuller (activist) =

American civil rights activist

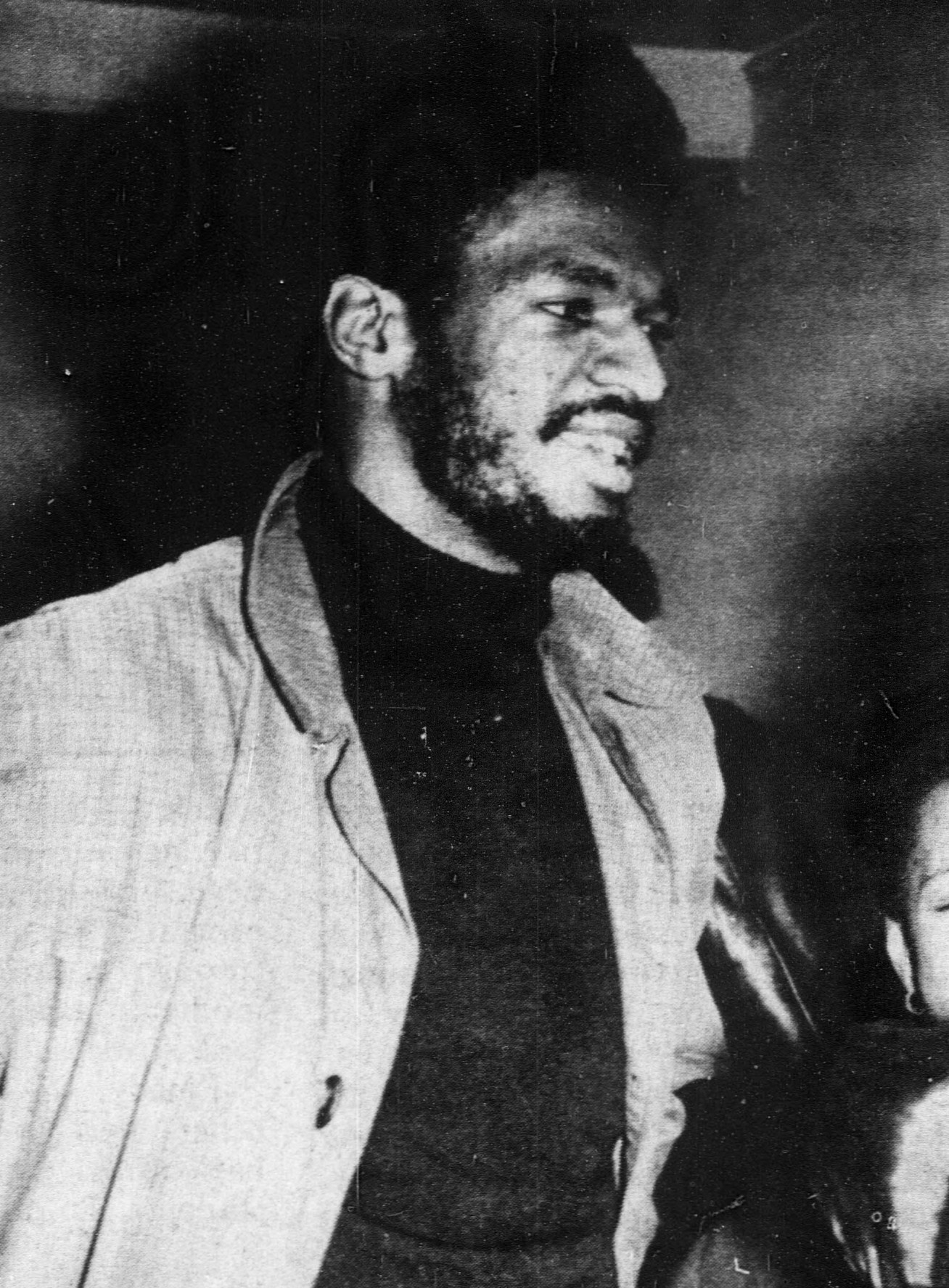
Fuller, circa 1969

Howard Fuller (born January 14, 1941) is a civil rights activist, education reform advocate, and academic. He is best known for the community organizing work he did in Durham, North Carolina, as an employee of Operation Breakthrough, and as a co-founder of the Malcolm X Liberation University in 1969. In the 1970s, Fuller adopted the name Owusu Sadaukai, organized several national African Liberation Day celebrations, and was one of the foremost advocates of Pan-Africanism in the United States. Decades later, Fuller rose again to national prominence as one of the leading advocates for school vouchers. He served as the superintendent of Milwaukee Public Schools from 1991-1995 and is currently a distinguished professor of education, and founder/director of the Institute for the Transformation of Learning at Marquette University in Milwaukee, Wisconsin.

Fuller's unique style of activism enabled him to become one of the most significant civil rights leaders in North Carolina from around 1965 to 1975. His evolving, complicated, and at times contradictory ideological positions throughout his career, however, also mirror many of the debates and conflicts of the black freedom struggle of the 1960s, '70s and beyond.

== Early life and education ==
Dr. Howard Fuller was born in Shreveport, Louisiana, on January 14, 1941, as the only child to Tom and Juanita Fuller, who were sharecroppers. His parents divorced not long after his birth, and his mother moved to Milwaukee, Wisconsin, in search of employment. After living with his grandmother, he moved to live with his mother at age seven. Raised Catholic, he attended St. Boniface Catholic Parochial School for elementary and middle school and North Division for high school. He was the sole black student at St. Boniface. From an early age, he demonstrated leadership qualities, leading "the student body of every school he attended". He was also a skilled basketball player, and this skill earned him a basketball scholarship to Carroll College in Waukesha, Wisconsin, to study sociology. By matriculating, Fuller joined the first racially integrated class at Carroll. He then went on to study at Case Western Reserve University and graduated with a Master's in Social Administration. He also earned a Ph.D. in Sociological Foundations of Education from Marquette University in 1986.

Fuller was raised in mixed-income black-majority neighborhoods as well as racially integrated neighborhoods. During his earliest years in Milwaukee, he resided in the sharply segregated northern Near Downtown neighborhood. Historian Jonathan Coleman argued, "a community where people went off to work, all sorts of people—from the factory workers who punched in at A.O. Smith and American Motors to teachers and clergymen to doctors and lawyers in fine suits with snappy briefcases. If there were any pluses to segregation, this was perhaps the biggest one—because everybody, regardless of income, more or less lived within close proximity of everybody else, there was a sense of unity, of being part of a larger family a feeling that if a doctor lived next door to you, what was to prevent you from becoming a doctor too?".

The housing crisis in Milwaukee, arising from an influx of black economic migrants as well as returning white World War 2 veterans, prompted an expansion of the city's public housing program. This "…resulted in the building of Hillside Terrace, where Fuller resided throughout his childhood". Here, he interacted with both black and white children of diverse educational and wealth backgrounds. Fuller said that it was his unique childhood experience that prompted him to "…see all races as equals, hate income disparity, and choose civil rights activism as the only career for [him]".

== Initiation of Civil Rights Activism career ==
It was during his time as a student at Case Western Reserve University that he participated in his first protest – a sit-in in 1964 to oppose the construction of a "…new public school in a predominantly black area of Cleveland on the grounds that it would surely be segregated". Here, he saw a Presbyterian minister get crushed by a bulldozer.

Fuller's transition from part-time student activist to black power militant was likely triggered by this incident. He described it as the "end of my non-violent career... I mean non violence as a philosophy". It prompted him to change the way he looked at the works of Malcolm X. "I saw myself as an integrationist and Malcolm was teaching separation. I was for non-violence and allegedly Malcolm was teaching violence. I was for supporting the philosophies of supporting Dr. King—calling for ‘loving the enemy'—Malcolm was preaching the philosophy that called for tick for tack (sic)". In her thesis "Never Stop Working: Examining the Life and Activism of Howard Fuller," Sarah Barber writes, "After Fuller's experience with the devastating effects of non-violent protest in Cleveland, for him Malcolm X and his philosophies were becoming less frightening and more fascinating".

== Activism in Chicago ==
Upon graduating from Case Western Reserve University in 1964, Fuller moved to Chicago to work as a community development specialist for the Urban League and community organizer for the Congress for Racial Equality. More intimate exposure to the plight of inner-city blacks during this experience promoted his ideological evolution. Historian Cedric Johnson writes, "His radicalization was facilitated by his immediate experiences as a social worker in inner-city Chicago and the mid-1960s sea change in black public discourse from liberal integration to Black Power militancy".

== Operation Breakthrough – Black Power phase ==
Fuller's "relentless impatience of youth" drove him to move to North Carolina in 1965 and take up a job as the director of community development at Operation Breakthrough (OBT). OBT is an anti-poverty non-profit that places an emphasis on mobilization of communities in need to enable them to empower themselves. OBT was funded by the North Carolina Fund, a state government-sponsored project that provided grants to local anti-poverty organizations.

His tenure at OBT proved to be the catalyst that greatly expanded Fuller's influence in the South's civil rights movement, cemented his place as one of Durham's most important black leaders, and pushed the further evolution of his ideology by providing him with the infrastructure to mobilize communities along the lines of his then black power leanings.

As the director of community development, Fuller described his responsibility, "[was] to stir people out of apathy". He did so not by delivering speeches on lofty principles such as equality and fair legal protection but by going door to door in impoverished Durham, NC neighborhoods, asking residents of their troubles, and mobilizing them by appealing to these relatively minor issues, which nonetheless negatively impacted their day-to-day lives. George Esser, the then-head of the North Carolina Fund, summed up Fuller's strategy:

"Howard soon demonstrated both his charismatic leadership, his appreciation for real community organization; that is, encouraging people to take a hand in their own lives, of neighborhoods to organize and come to the City Council or come to the County Commissioners and demand equal treatment in such mundane things as garbage collection, street lights and street paving and so forth."

Howard Fuller explained his method of mobilization and significance of his experience at OBT thusly:

"It was really in North Carolina that I learned everything that I know today about politics and so forth. And I learned most of it from the people that I was working with … I started out doing grass roots organizing at the neighborhood level trying to get streets paved, have houses fixed and get rid of rats. So that really shaped my opinion about the need for power."

By "disrupting people's inertia" and getting them involved in activism of any sort in the first place, Howard could then easily hone his small army into a more cerebral movement. George Esser said, "And over a period of time … he developed a black community in Durham that was asking for equal treatment of the poor and the middle class black community…". Charles W. McKinney Jr. writes, "Fuller's ability to both identify and cultivate indigenous leaders throughout town served as the primary catalyst for the success of OBT's efforts".

Through his efforts at OBT in organizing protests and rallies at Durham's city hall and universities, Fuller earned a reputation as a black power militant. By 1968, this reputation had grown to such an extent that the Federal Bureau of Investigation had started to monitor his activities.

== Malcolm X Liberation University – Pan Africanist and Marxist phase ==
On October 25, 1969, sparked by the Allen Building takeover crisis at Duke University, Fuller founded the Malcolm X Liberation University (MXLU)– a black-only university in Durham, NC intended to, "provide a framework within which Black Education can become relevant to the needs of the black community and the struggle for Black Liberation". It ceased operation on June 28, 1972, due to political infighting, staff turnover, and a lack of funding.

The school's curriculum was influenced by Fuller's black power views as well as his newer pan-Africanist and Marxist leanings. Evidencing the black power and pan-Africanist influences and tying the two together, the idea of MXLU, "began innocently, says Fuller, by ‘taking any subject and putting ‘black' in front of it. Black history had to be taught, for example, because it was not being passed down within the conventional institutional framework. Inevitably, this led to the need for a historical understanding of the African race, when combined with the knowledge of imperialism exposed by the anti-war movement led the university to a political movement called Pan-Africanism (a global extension of Black Power)". Earlier in 1969, Fuller had declared a focus of the university to, "teach here why we must bring down capitalism," evidencing his newly acquired Marxist beliefs.

Initial funding for MXLU came from a Durham-based anti-poverty nonprofit called the Foundation for Community Development (FCD), which was in turn funded primarily by the Office of Economic Opportunity (OEO). The OEO was a federal government initiative aimed at alleviating poverty throughout the country by providing funding to grassroots-level organizations like FCD. Fuller was the director of training of the FCD at the time that the $20,000 grant was given to MXLU.

Controversy engulfed MXLU since before its opening; firstly, the fact that Fuller was an executive in the very organization that gave money to his personal project raised concerns of a conflict of interest and a subsequent misappropriation of funds. Secondly, the OEO-FCD-MXLU chain of funding meant that the government was indirectly financing Fuller's activities. This government funding was taken to be representative of outright government support of violence, for which Fuller had earned a reputation during his OBT days. Historian Charles w. McKinney Jr. writes, "with the help of incendiary news coverage in Durham, Howard Fuller became a racial caricature – the regional symbol of an ominous, state-sanctioned black radicalism that ran amok throughout the state".

Many historians believe that Fuller adopted his pan-Africanist and Marxist views during his visit to Africa in which he traveled with black freedom fighters in Mozambique. However, he traveled to Africa in August 1971, while he had made his pan-Africanist and Marxist remarks in 1969 in the context of MXLU. This means that his transition into believing these ideas happened slowly during his tenure at OBT. It is these beliefs, primarily his Marxist ones, which differentiated his OBT and MXLU phases. Prior to his MXLU days, Fuller had seen the class disparity and the resulting injustices inflicted on the disadvantaged as a function primarily driven by racial discrimination. However, by around 1969, he had started to see class disparity as an original injustice of its own, perpetuated by the wealthy to subjugate the poor regardless of race. These new beliefs had made Howard enemies among Durham's population of wealthy black people. North Carolina Fund staffers in an in-house memo wrote, "The city's negro elite were among the most bothered by Fuller".

With a growing list of enemies and a scandal over the issue of funding for MXLU, North Carolina Republican politicians attempted to seize the opportunity that they had been given in order to reduce Fuller's influence in the working-class black community. South Carolina Senator Strom Thurmond urged the director of the OEO, Dick Cheney, to cancel the funding to FCD on the grounds that, "funding known militants like Fuller would destroy public confidence in government programs". He agreed, and funding to the FCD was halted. Local Durham GOP office holders responded to the OEO's decision by advising them to continue funding programs in Durham but to do so through a more moderate leader. They nominated David Stith, who was another notable local black leader. He, too, engaged in community organization and ran local anti-poverty campaigns. Moreover, Stith was the president of the Southeastern Business College in Durham and had connections throughout the city's business community. Local and national politicians favored him to receive the federal funds because he did not have the stigma of being associated with the black power movement. However, Fuller quickly regained public support by "… excoriat[ing] Stith for befriending Abe Greenberg, a Durham landlord who refused to bring rental properties up to code. A personal friend of Greenberg, Stith tried to arbitrate the dispute between lessor and tenants. Instead, Stith was taken to be Greenberg's vested ally". As a result, George Stith was discredited, and local GOP leaders had no choice but to recommend FCD, and therefore Howard Fuller, as the recipient of the OEO grant.

MXLU's primary investor after the initial funding from the FCD was the Federation of Pan-African Institutions, "a consortium of nation-building elementary, secondary, and higher educational academies dedicated to black cultural nationalism," of which it was a member. The Federation, in turn, was primarily funded by the national Episcopal Church. MXLU received one round of grants from the Church but was denied the second time due to the ideological "struggle between the alternative revolutionary college and members of the state's upper stratum of blacks". As a result, MXLU lost its ability to pay for the land lease and shut its doors in 1972.

Fuller's adoption of more radical beliefs cost him dearly and constantly threatened to eliminate the level of influence he had in Durham and the civil rights movement. Still, he defied strong opposition and managed to maintain significance within the community of civil rights advocates, and in doing so, proved himself to be an adept community organizer, leader, and politician.

== Education reform advocacy and present day activities ==
Reeling from the loss of MXLU, Fuller fell into a spiral of radicalization, culminating in his association with the Revolutionary Workers League (RWL), a Marxist black power extremist group. The RWL held a two-day conference to which Fuller took a group of friends. There, they were, "humiliated, mentally tortured and physically beaten by other members of the group". This experience shocked Fuller out of radical beliefs and prompted him to move back home to Milwaukee.

Once in Milwaukee, he initially obtained a job as an insurance salesman, and one year thereafter, he became an associate director of the Equal Opportunity Program at Marquette University. In this capacity, he extended access to the private university to disadvantaged students.

A notable early victory in his contemporary moderate education reform advocacy phase was the cessation of the Milwaukee School Board's plan to clear out North Division High School's student body and rebuild the school as a magnet school with a focus on medicine and dentistry.

From 1991 to 1995, Fuller served as superintendent of the Milwaukee Public Schools. Today, Fuller continues to advocate for educational system reforms. He particularly focuses on school choice and argues for the dismantling of teacher's unions. His nonprofit, the Black Alliance for Educational Options, promotes school vouchers to enable low-income children to attend private schools. He is a distinguished professor of education, and founder/director of the Institute for the Transformation of Learning at Marquette University in Milwaukee, Wisconsin.

== Ideology ==
Around the central theme of African American upliftment, Howard Fuller tried many different approaches and methods. At different points in his life, he focused on race, poverty, and class division. During his early black power years, he focused on race. During his Marxist phase, he focused on class division and poverty. Now, he gives all three elements roughly equal treatment. Throughout his career, however, education and black uplift thereby has been the common thread by which his various ideologies and methods have been linked. This is evidenced by his involvement in a range of educational issues starting from the foundation of MXLU to his more recent tenure as superintendent of the Milwaukee school district and ongoing freedom of choice advocacy for schools.

In one 1996 interview, he said, "it has to do with the nature of the black struggle in the South, in that although there were clearly class issues involved, there was a lot more unity around race that came into play", indicating that class was not as important as race. In another from the same year, he said, "So, race is right there. Class is right there. There is nothing quaint or redeeming about being poor" indicating that he felt class was at least as important as race. While it is unclear exactly how he felt in 1996, it is evident that his priorities shifted during his lifetime. However, the fact that, while shifting, his priorities and approaches always revolved around the central pillar of African American uplift through education sheds light on the interconnected nature of race, education, poverty, and class and clarifies the complexity of racial disparity and inequity.

== Impact and significance ==
Though troubled and convoluted, the trajectory of Howard Fuller's career mirrors the history of the civil rights movement as a whole. Like the movement, Fuller's career held many twists and turns. The same ideological infighting (over a disagreement in methods employed to achieve a common goal) that resulted in the assassination of Malcolm X led to the closing of MXLU. The same lack of funds that contributed to closing MXLU forced other civil rights leaders to hold dangerously large gatherings in overcapacity churches. Fuller evolved as the civil rights movement evolved often contained multiple conflicting facets of the movement within him.
