= List of awards and nominations received by Taraji P. Henson =

Taraji P. Henson awards and nominations
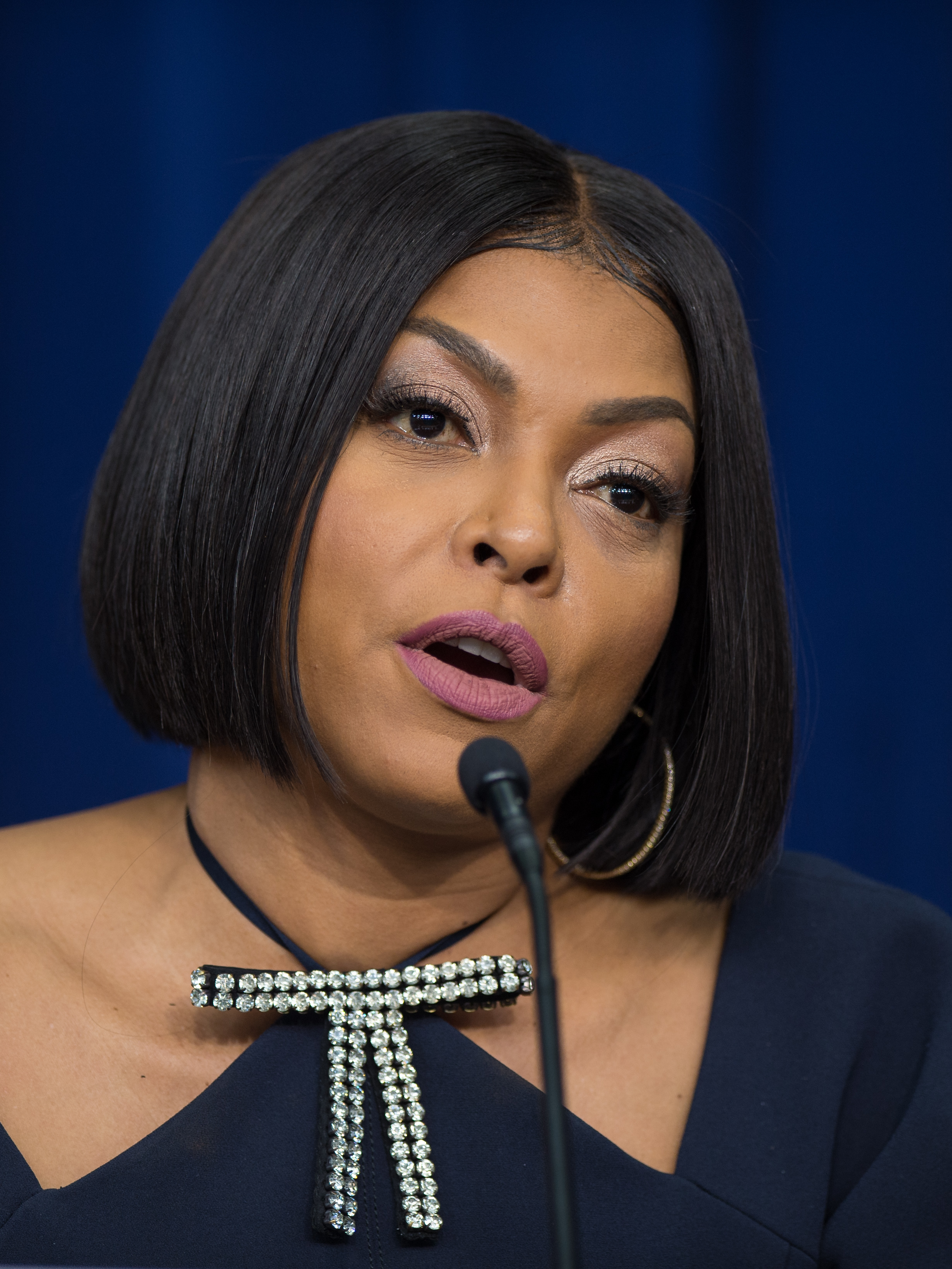
- Henson in 2016
Awards and nominations
Award	Wins	Nominations
Academy Awards	0	1
Critics' Choice Awards	1	6
Emmy Awards	0	6
Golden Globe Awards	1	1
SAG Awards	1	7
Tony Awards	0	1

Totals (Note: Certain award groups do not simply award one winner. They acknowledge several different recipients, have runners-up, and have third place. Since this is a specific recognition and is different from losing an award, runner-up mentions are considered wins in this award tally. For simplification and to avoid errors, each award in this list has been presumed to have had a prior nomination.)
- Wins: 38
- Nominations: 76

This is a list of awards and nominations received by American actress Taraji P. Henson. She has received various awards and nominations, winning one Golden Globe Award, one Critics' Choice Movie Award, and a Screen Actors Guild Award. Additionally, she has been nominated for one Academy Award, three Primetime Emmy Awards, and two Daytime Emmy Awards. In 2019, Henson received a star on the Hollywood Walk of Fame for her contributions to the motion picture industry.

In 2005, she was in Hustle & Flow's cast, which gave her her first Screen Actors Guild Award nomination. Henson's breakthrough role in the 2008 acclaimed romantic drama film The Curious Case of Benjamin Button earned her an Academy Award nomination for Best Supporting Actress.

She gained wider recognition for her role as Cookie Lyon on the Fox television series Empire (2009–2015), which earned her a Golden Globe and a Critics' Choice Television Award for Best Actress in a Drama Series, becoming the first African-American actress to do so. The television series also garnered her two Primetime Emmy Award nominations in the same category. In 2016, she starred as NASA mathematician Katherine Johnson in the biographical drama Hidden Figures, which won her a MTV Movie Award for Best Hero and an NAACP Image Award for Outstanding Actress. Henson and her co-stars were selected as the Best Cast from the National Board of Review and won Best Cast from the Screen Actors Guild and Satellite Awards.

In 2024, Henson received a Tony Award nomination for Best Play, as a producer of Jaja's African Hair Braiding.

== Major associations ==
=== Academy Awards ===
Year	Category	Work	Result	Ref.
2008	Best Supporting Actress	The Curious Case of Benjamin Button	Nominated	

=== Critics' Choice Awards ===
Year	Category	Work	Result	Ref.
Film
2009	Best Supporting Actress	The Curious Case of Benjamin Button	Nominated	
2009	Best Acting Ensemble	The Curious Case of Benjamin Button	Nominated (Note: Shared with the cast.)	
2016	Best Acting Ensemble	Hidden Figures	Nominated	
2024	Best Acting Ensemble	The Color Purple	Nominated	
Television
2015	Best Actress in a Drama Series	Empire	Won	
2016	Best Actress in a Drama Series	Empire	Nominated	

=== Emmy Awards ===
Year	Category	Work	Result	Ref.
Primetime Emmy Awards
2011	Outstanding Lead Actress in a Limited Series or Movie	Taken from Me: The Tiffany Rubin Story	Nominated	
2015	Outstanding Lead Actress in a Drama Series	Empire	Nominated	
2016	Outstanding Lead Actress in a Drama Series	Empire	Nominated	
2023	Outstanding Guest Actress in a Comedy Series	Abbott Elementary	Nominated	
Daytime Emmy Awards
2021	Outstanding Informative Talk Show Host	Peace of Mind with Taraji	Nominated	
2022	Outstanding Informative Talk Show Host	Peace of Mind with Taraji	Nominated	

=== Golden Globe Awards ===
Year	Category	Work	Result	Ref.
2016	Best Actress – Television Series Drama	Empire	Won	

=== Screen Actors Guild Awards ===
Year	Category	Work	Result	Ref.
2006	Outstanding Cast in a Motion Picture	Hustle & Flow	Nominated	
2008	Outstanding Ensemble in a Drama Series	Boston Legal	Nominated	
2009	Outstanding Ensemble in a Drama Series	Boston Legal	Nominated	
2009	Outstanding Actress in a Supporting Role	The Curious Case of Benjamin Button	Nominated	
2009	Outstanding Cast in a Motion Picture	The Curious Case of Benjamin Button	Nominated	
2017	Outstanding Cast in a Motion Picture	Hidden Figures	Won	
2024	Outstanding Cast in a Motion Picture	The Color Purple	Nominated	

=== Tony Awards ===
Year	Category	Work	Result	Ref.
2024	Best Play	Jaja’s African Hair Braiding	Nominated	

== Other associations ==
=== Black Reel Award ===
Year	Nominee / work	Award	Result
2002	Baby Boy	Best Actress	Nominated
2006	Hustle & Flow	Best Ensemble	Won
2006	Four Brothers	Best Ensemble	Nominated
2009	The Curious Case of Benjamin Button	Best Supporting Actress	Nominated
2010	I Can Do Bad All By Myself	Best Actress	Nominated
2012	Taken from Me: The Tiffany Rubin Story	Outstanding Actress, TV Movie or Limited Series	Won
2017	Hidden Figures	Best Actress	Nominated
2019	Ralph Breaks the Internet	Outstanding Voice Performance	Nominated
2024	The Color Purple	Outstanding Supporting Performance in a Motion Picture	Nominated

=== Black Reel Award for Television ===
Year	Nominee / work	Award	Result
2017	Empire	Outstanding Actress, Drama Series	Nominated
2018	Empire	Outstanding Actress, Drama Series	Nominated
2023	Abbott Elementary	Outstanding Guest performance, Comedy Series	Won
2025	Fight Night	Outstanding Supporting Performance in a TV Movie or Limited Series	Nominated

=== BET Awards ===
Year	Nominee / work	Award	Result
2006	Hustle & Flow	Best Actress	Won
2009	The Curious Case of Benjamin Button	Best Actress	Won
2010	I Can Do Bad All by Myself	Best Actress	Nominated
2011	Taken from Me: The Tiffany Rubin Story and The Karate Kid	Best Actress	Won
2012	Person of Interest	Best Actress	Nominated
2013	Person of Interest and Think Like a Man	Best Actress	Nominated
2015	Empire	Best Actress	Won
2016	Empire	Best Actress	Won
2017	Hidden Figures	Best Actress	Won
2018	Proud Mary and Acrimony	Best Actress	Nominated
2019	Empire	Best Actress	Nominated

=== NAACP Image Awards ===
Year	Nominee / work	Award	Result
2006	Hustle & Flow	Outstanding Supporting Actress in a Motion Picture	Nominated
2008	Talk to Me	Outstanding Actress in a Motion Picture	Nominated
2009	The Curious Case of Benjamin Button	Outstanding Supporting Actress in a Motion Picture	Won
2010	I Can Do Bad All by Myself	Outstanding Actress in a Motion Picture	Nominated
2012	Taken from Me: The Tiffany Rubin Story	Outstanding Actress in a Television Movie, Mini-Series or Dramatic Special	Won
2012	Person of Interest	Outstanding Actress in a Drama Series	Nominated
2013	Think Like a Man	Outstanding Supporting Actress in a Motion Picture	Nominated
2014	Person of Interest	Outstanding Supporting Actress in a Drama Series	Won
2015		Entertainer of the Year	Won
2015	No Good Deed	Outstanding Actress in a Motion Picture	Won
2016	Empire	Outstanding Actress in a Drama Series	Won
2017	Hidden Figures	Outstanding Actress in a Motion Picture	Won
2017	Around The Way Girl: A Memoir	Outstanding Literary Work Biography/Autobiography	Nominated
2017	Empire	Outstanding Actress in a Drama Series	Won
2018	Empire	Outstanding Actress in a Drama Series	Won
2019	Empire	Outstanding Actress in a Drama Series	Won
2022	Annie Live!	Outstanding Actress in a Television Movie, Limited-Series or Dramatic Special	Won
2023	Minions: The Rise of Gru	Outstanding Character Voice-Over Performance - Motion Picture	Nominated
2023	BET Awards 2022	Outstanding Host in a Reality, Game Show or Variety (Series or Special)	Nominated
2024	The Color Purple	Outstanding Supporting Actress in a Motion Picture	Won
2024	The Color Purple	Outstanding Ensemble Cast in a Motion Picture	Won
2025	BET Awards 2024	Outstanding Host in a Reality, Game Show or Variety (Series or Special)	Nominated
2025	Fight Night	Outstanding Supporting Actress in a Television Movie, Limited-Series or Dramatic Special	Won
2025	You Can Be a Good Friend (No Matter What!): A Lil Tj Book	Outstanding Literary Work – Children	Won
2026	Straw	Outstanding Actress in a Television Movie, Mini-Series or Dramatic Special	Won

=== Nickelodeon Kids' Choice Awards ===
Year	Nominee / work	Award	Result
2023	Minions: The Rise of Gru	Favorite Voice from an Animated Movie (Female)	Nominated

=== Palm Springs International Film Festival ===
Year	Nominee / work	Award	Result
2017	Hidden Figures	Ensemble Performance Award	Won

=== People's Choice Awards ===
Year	Nominee / work	Award	Result
2016	Empire	Favorite Dramatic TV Actress	Nominated
2017	Empire	Favorite Dramatic TV Actress	Nominated

=== Satellite Awards ===
Year	Nominee / work	Award	Result
2007	Talk to Me	Best Supporting Actress in a Motion Picture	Nominated
2011	Taken from Me: The Tiffany Rubin Story	Best Actress in a Miniseries or TV Film	Nominated
2016	Empire	Best Actress in a Drama Series	Nominated
2017	Hidden Figures	Best Actress in a Motion Picture	Nominated
2017	Hidden Figures	Best Cast – Motion Picture	Won

=== Saturn Awards ===
Year	Nominee / work	Award	Result
2017	Hidden Figures	Best Actress	Nominated

=== Teen Choice Awards ===
Year	Nominee / work	Award	Result
2015	Choice TV: Actress Drama	Empire	Nominated
2015	Choice TV: Chemistry	Empire	Nominated
2016	Choice TV: Actress Drama	Empire	Nominated
2017	Choice Movie Actress: Drama	Hidden Figures	Nominated

== Critics awards ==
Critics' Awards
Year	Work	Category	Result	Ref.
AARP Movies for Grownups Awards
2024	The Color Purple	Best Supporting Actress	Nominated	
2024	The Color Purple	Best Ensemble	Won	
African-American Film Critics Association
2016	Hidden Figures	Best Ensemble	Won	
2024	The Color Purple	Best Ensemble	Won	
Awards Circuit Community
2008	The Curious Case of Benjamin Button	Best Ensemble	Nominated	
2008	The Curious Case of Benjamin Button	Best Actress in a Supporting Role	Nominated	
2016	Hidden Figures	Best Ensemble	Nominated	
Astra Film and Creative Awards
2024	The Color Purple	Best Cast Ensemble	Won	
Austin Film Critics Association
2009	The Curious Case of Benjamin Button	Best Supporting Actress	Won	
Celebration of Cinema and Television
2023	The Color Purple	Ensemble Award – Film	Won	
Florida Film Critics Circle
2016	Hidden Figures	Best Ensemble	Nominated	
GALECA: The Society of LGBTQ Entertainment Critics
2016	Empire	TV Performance of the Year - Actress	Won	
Georgia Film Critics Association
2017	Hidden Figures'	Best Ensembless	Nominated	
Gotham Independent Film Awards
2007	Talk to Me	Best Ensemble Performance	Won	
Hawaii Film Critics Society
2019	Ralph Breaks the Internet	Best Vocal/Motion Capture Performance	Nominated	
Houston Film Critics Society Awards
2008	The Curious Case of Benjamin Button	Best Supporting Actress	Nominated	
Las Vegas Film Critics Society Award
2016	Hidden Figures	Best Actress	Nominated	
2016	Hidden Figures	Best Ensemble	Won	
Locarno International Film Festival
2001	Baby Boy	Best Ensemble Acting	Won	
MTV Movie & TV Awards
2006	Hustle & Flow	Best Breakthrough Performance	Nominated	
2006	Hustle & Flow	Best Kiss	Nominated	
2009	The Curious Case of Benjamin Button	Best Female Performance	Nominated	
2017	Hidden Figures	Best Actor in a Movie	Nominated	
2017	Hidden Figures	Best Hero	Won	
2017	Empire	Best Kiss	Nominated	
St. Louis Film Critics Association
2007	Talk to Me	Best Supporting Actress	Nominated	
2008	The Curious Case of Benjamin Button	Best Supporting Actress	Nominated	
Television Critics Association
2015	Empire	Individual Achievement in Drama	Nominated	
Women Film Critics Circle
2016	Hidden Figures	Best Actress	Nominated	
2016	Hidden Figures	Best Ensemble	Won	
2019	The Best of Enemies	The Inivisble Woman Award	Nominated	
2019		Acting and Activism Award	Nominated	
Washington DC Area Film Critics Association
2005	Hustle & Flow	Best Supporting Actress	Nominated	
