= Operation Breakthrough (anti-poverty movement) =

American anti-poverty movement

Operation Breakthrough is an anti-poverty movement founded by Terry Sandford in August 1964, established in Durham, North Carolina. It played a prominent and influential role in the expansion of the Civil Rights Movement in Durham. In the 1960s, one quarter of the adults in North Carolina that were older than 25 years had received at most a sixth-grade level education. This would suggest that many were illiterate.^{2}

The concept, developed through the North Carolina Fund, was mimicked throughout the nation.

Throughout this movement, activism played a fundamental role. The main aim of the program consisted of changing the economic situation of a state through the use of political and social power.

== History ==
=== Economic situation of Durham in the 1960s ===
In the mid-20th century, Durham's economic situation was not as idyllic as people might have thought. Indeed, Durham was an unequal town where huge disparities among the citizens existed. Equality and civil rights had been promised to the United States after a decade of intense activism^{4}, but all of this without success. According to the data (Exhibit A) compiled by the Action for Durham Development, by the 1960s there were 5,215 families out of 18,690 that had an overall income of less than $3000 per year—approximately 28% of the families in Durham were in poverty. This represented a considerable number of impoverished families. Furthermore, many citizens of Durham, both rich and poor, began to leave the city to seek better job opportunities and to escape from poverty: "In the [1960s], the number [of citizens out-migrating] fell to 30,000… continuing loss… of 6-10 percent of young adults between the ages of twenty and thirty-five." Consequently the constant loss of youths from Durham—and from North Carolina—resulted in a decreasing economy due to "costs of lost productivity, of lost purchasing power, and of the relief rolls."

Much of Durham's economic decline was due to the rapid industrialization of the tobacco and textile industries following World War II. While these industries had once provided plentiful jobs in Durham, advances in mechanized production led to significant job cuts after the 1940s.

Durham was going through economic instability due to the rapid industrialization that was occurring. Although industrialization made production easier and quicker, jobs were lost as they were replaced with machines. Soon, these economic issues gave birth to a variety of new issues that further affected the welfare of the citizens of Durham.

Governor Terry Sanford wished to take a shift of direction and create integration opportunities for the population of Durham. In 1963, he created the North Carolina Fund, which relied on a five-year plan to put an end to segregation and economic discrimination.^{6} Even though poverty had been an issue for a long period of time, it had not been acknowledged. Indeed, because of high emigration rates that were due to the slowing down of the Industrial Revolution effects, as well as the decline of agricultural job opportunities, the rate of growth in the 1960s was dropping, therefore raising the level of poverty throughout the state of North Carolina, and Durham especially because of the development of the tobacco industry.^{8} By creating the North Carolina Fund, Sanford was exploring opportunities to enable the local population to be part of the workforce in an evolving society.

=== The relation between race and poverty ===
The link between race and poverty was first acknowledged by Sanford in 1961 when he realized that many African-American factory workers were paid less than minimal wage, about half of the students dropped out of high school without having obtained a high school diploma, and most of the adults were illiterate.^{9} Seeing how alarming the situation was in the state of North Carolina, the governor realized that he was facing a pressing issue that was not only affecting the African-American community of Durham, but was also blocking the economic growth and spread of the industries found in that region. Most of the recipients of the program were African Americans, but it was not exclusively directed toward them, which served as an incentive for the general population to accept it. Even though the level of white poverty was a lot lower, Operation Breakthrough was still helpful to them. It was also a way to emphasize that poverty affected the general population, and not only one ethnic group, which overall served as a great marketing strategy. Even though Operation Breakthrough engaged itself in some civil rights work, it was not considered to be a civil rights organization. The Black community started to discover that they could have a voice in their community, and decided to fight for their rights and better living conditions. People started to request that their basic needs were met, just like Ann Atwater did, with the support of Howard Fuller, when she finally decided to go talk to her landlord to demand reparations in her house. She then was recruited as a supervisor for neighborhood workers for the Operation Breakthrough program as well as declared head of the Housing Committee for United Organizations.^{11} She was strongly involved in the Civil Rights Movement. Seeing the success Operation Breakthrough had in North Carolina, the program was then extended to different states, being modified to respond to the needs of different communities.

=== The emergence of the North Carolina Fund ===
The program was initially started as thousands of families were far below the poverty line and were not even sure of what they would be able to get on a daily basis. This pioneering program was to be designed and implemented by local communities that would best be able to target the needs of the lower-class population.^{13} The fund relied not only on providing economic support but depended greatly on social and political collaboration. With the creation of the North Carolina Fund, the state was initiating an "all out assault on poverty."^{14} This non-profit corporation was a precursor to the creation of future similar organizations, aiming to address the long, and still processing, war on poverty.^{15} The lack of opportunities for minorities reinforced the poverty cycle. As Sanford said, the North Carolina Fund was going to be the "first massive statewide effort in our country to find ways to break the cycle of poverty and dependency."^{16} One of the first focuses was education. Through the intensification of schooling methods, citizens were becoming more prone to find jobs as well as more self-reliable. However, this was not sufficient. As Sanford said, "A child who goes to school with no breakfast under his belt does not have equal opportunity to learn, excel, and move toward adulthood in which he will be able to use his talents and energies and intellect in a self-respecting role in society."^{17} It was therefore necessary not only to sustain the education of a child but also to provide resources to his family, both educationally and on a more basic level such as providing essential living resources.

Terry Sanford worked with his aides to convince the Ford Foundation to invest in their anti-poverty plan: "In early 1963, as Sanford's team continued their efforts to convince the Ford Foundation that North Carolina was the right place to launch a new anti-poverty initiative, they turned for assistance not to lawmakers in Raleigh but to wealthy white philanthropists in Winston-Salem and black power brokers in Durham." Through many years of diligence, Sanford was successful in attaining money to begin an anti-poverty initiative: "In July 1963, Ford president Henry Heald and members of his staff made their last pre-grant visit to North Carolina…[The Ford Foundation] called on Wheeler and asked for his frank assessment of Sanford's plans for battling poverty…Heald assured Sanford that Ford would commit $7 million to a statewide antipoverty campaign."

=== Origins of Operation Breakthrough ===
The program was established to end the cycle of poverty in Durham. The city was impoverished and a victim of a segregationist movement. Inequalities resulted from these two issues. Operation Breakthrough strives to eliminate poverty throughout the city while also empowering the low-income population who are often under represented and unheard in the society. To achieve these goals, activist movements were pursued, and educational and vocational training were provided to anyone in need.

For the program to be effective, officials decided the initial and most urgent target had to be Durham youth, as they represented the future generations of Durham and therefore the economic development and sustainability depended on them and their education. The program focused, therefore, on access to education. With financial support (for food and education) from various funds, the youth were able to complete their high school education. They also had the opportunity to develop working skills to prepare them for the work force. Initial funding was through the Office of Economic Opportunity and the North Carolina Fund.^{19} After achieving the initial goal of reaching out to the youth, the program extended its targets to adults, to provide them with job opportunities and access to day care. To make communications more effective, the Neighborhood Advisory Council^{20} was formed and they endorsed the role of representatives of the communities of individuals. Indeed, one of the main innovations of that program was the direct incorporation of members of the community in the decision committee: a representative was elected from the lower-class population to sit on the Operation Breakthrough Board of Directors.^{21} To represent the minority of African-Americans, Howard Fuller, a black activist, was elected to be the coordinator of the program in the community. Born in Louisiana in 1941, Fuller was one of the few African-Americans to have received access to a higher education. Because of that, he was hired by Operation Breakthrough in 1965 and was recognized as the leader of the black community to help in the coordination of the program. Furthermore, he acknowledged that influencing the black community as a whole was far more important than "simply recruiting black representatives for the Operation Breakthrough board of directors."^{22} Because of his many interventions in the movement against poverty, he was perceived as "Black Jesus" by the lower-class African-American citizens. He became the public face of Operation Breakthrough, as well as the most important black activist in the city of Durham.^{24} .

Composed initially of a group of nine people, Operation Breakthrough then developed into a more important and influential non-profit organization, striving successfully to influence people's lives in a positive way by responding to their basic needs. One of the important points to underline is that most of the members of the council were white and wealthy. For that reason, it was fundamental to put some members of the lower class on the council so they would be represented and acknowledged. Durham's local government was deeply involved, as the mayor of the time, R. Wense Grabarek, was one of the original incorporators.^{25}

=== The North Carolina Fund and Operation Breakthrough ===
The collaboration between the North Carolina Fund and Operation Breakthrough (OB) started in 1964, at the very beginning of OB. The aim of that collaboration was to create slowly a city that would be able to sustain itself economically. Indeed, the North Carolina Fund represented one of the key supporters of OB and help for the implementation of the different goals. Reaching that goal required more job opportunities and better state funding. To assure program success, people directly affected by the consequences of poverty and segregation were put on the board to represent the voices of minorities. Howard Fuller^{27}, a black activist, was elected to be the coordinator of the program in the community.

== Evolution ==
=== Concentrated New Employment Program ===
Seeing the success the program had, more and more people were willing to invest into it and Operation Breakthrough gained more and more sponsors, upon which we could find civic groups, different businesses, as well as churches. To pursue the goal of providing a more stable socio-economic situation for the lower class of the population, the Concentrated New Employment Program was created. 2,966,438 dollars were brought to sustain such a development and assure the feasibility of the program.

=== Health, Education, and Welfare ===
A huge emphasis was put on education and how to support the evolution of children in Durham, as they represented the future of the city. Health, Education and Welfare (HEW)^{28}, a program that was part of the Federal Government, supported financially and promoted the creation of a Head Start Summer Program, which later grew and evolved into becoming a Full Year Head Start Program.^{29} Not only was it directed to education, but it also supported the education of adults and provided job opportunities for day care support, and for volunteers to help to development and growth of the program. A program such as HEW shows the support that Operation Breakthrough received from the Federal government. Indeed, "Operation Breakthrough's reliance on federal funds offered a way of undermining the poverty agency's ability to organize and mobilize poor blacks."^{30}

=== Support and Development ===
Operation Breakthrough also brought very strong support to the public workers by accompanying them in their working environment, creating regulations for the minimum wages they were allowed to receive. They were also provided with various training sessions, that would not only enhance their chances in finding a job but that would also simply provide them more tools that could open opportunities for them in life. In 1967, to further reinforce the positive developments of Operation Breakthrough, New Careers was founded.^{31} This program focused on improving various aspects of the community, which would strongly ameliorate the local individuals' daily lives. The whole program focused not only on improving the socio-economic condition of the community, but also strove for a cultural and physical impact to make the population more flexible and able to access different career types.

Furthermore, various volunteer programs and services were offered such as the CASH recreation program. This program offered a choice of various activities as well as recreational facilities for rainy days in the summer. This also helped parents work without worrying about child care, so they could earn a steady income for their family.

== Legacy of the program ==
Overall, the program puts a light on the economic situation of Durham. Indeed, because of the flourishing of the tobacco industry, it appears hard to picture Durham devastated by poverty and as a segregated city.

The facilities developed by the help of Operation Breakthrough still remain prominent actors for the flourishing of Durham as an independent and growing city. The Head Start's Child Development Center^{32} was opened on November 18, 2004 and helped provide a high standard education for children, as well as educate parents on how to have a positive impact on their family. This program not only helps sustain families but it also provides help to children with disabilities, through the establishment of a personalized study plan that responds to his or her needs. Furthermore, it collaborates with the Durham Public Schools^{33} to transition from this specific program to integration into public schools as smoothly as possible.

During his war on poverty, Johnson highly inspired himself from the non-profit North Carolina Fund program^{34}. Indeed, the program served as a template for Johnson's intervention to end the cycle of poverty that reigned in America. To do so, Johnson said that the initial targets had to be focused on education and health care, which were similar examples to the North Carolina Fund and Operation Breakthrough.
