= Osha Gray Davidson =

American journalist

Osha Gray Davidson is an author, free-lance writer, photographer and podcaster. He was born in Passaic, New Jersey, and grew up in Iowa, studying at the University of Iowa.

Davidson is an author of six books of non-fiction and more than a hundred articles on a range of topics. He is currently a contributing writer at Yale Climate Connections and Sierra magazine. Davidson covered the environment for Rolling Stone magazine and blogged on renewable energy at Forbes.com. His freelance work has also appeared in InsideClimate News, Grist, The New York Times, The Washington Post, Salon, Mother Jones, and other publications. Davidson co-wrote the screenplay for the IMAX documentary Coral Reef Adventure and his photographs have appeared in Rolling Stone, InsideClimate News, Forbes.com, and elsewhere.

He is the producer and host of the popular podcast, "The American Project: Deep reporting on a democracy in the works." Season 1 (starting in January 2020) looks at the issue of reparations for slavery and its legacy.

His book The Best of Enemies: Race and Redemption in the New South was first published in 1996 and reissued in paperback in 2007. It was adapted into a play by Mark St. Germain in 2011. A film adaptation was released in April 2019, starring Sam Rockwell and Taraji Henson.

His Rolling Stone article about Lori Piestewa, the first Native American woman to die in combat fighting for the United States, was nominated for a National Magazine Award for feature writing. He was a finalist for both the Natural World Book Award (UK) and the Helen Bernstein Book Award for Excellence in Journalism. Coral Reef Adventure was the highest grossing documentary film of 2003 and was voted Best Picture of 2003 by the Giant Screen Theatre Association. He is a member of the Society of Environmental Journalists and a Fellow at the University of Iowa Center for Human Rights.

Davidson lives in Phoenix, Arizona.

== Bibliography ==
- Clean Break: The Story of Germany's Energy Transformation and What Americans Can Learn From It (2012)
- Fire in the Turtle House: The Green Sea Turtle and the Fate of the Ocean (revised and updated, 2003)
- The Enchanted Braid: Coming to Terms with Nature on the Coral Reef (1998)
- The Best of Enemies: Race and Redemption in the New South (paperback with a new introduction, 2007; chosen as Summer Reading for the Duke Incoming Class of '11 due to its connection with Durham, NC)
- Under Fire: The NRA and the Battle for Gun Control (revised and updated, 1998)
- Broken Heartland: The Rise of Americans' Rural Ghetto (revised and updated, 1996)

== See also ==
- Rural ghetto
