= Malcolm X Liberation University =

Former educational institution in North Carolina

- Active: October 25, 1969–June 28, 1973
- Founder: Howard Fuller
- Location: Durham and Greensboro, North Carolina, US

Malcolm X Liberation University (or MXLU) was an experimental educational institution inspired by the Black Power and Pan-Africanist movements and located in Durham and Greensboro, North Carolina. Howard Fuller (also known as Owusu Sadaukai), Bertie Howard, and several other African American activists in North Carolina founded the school in response to the 1969 Allen Building Takeover on Duke University's campus. It operated from October 25, 1969 to June 28, 1973. Political conflicts damaged the school's reputation, making it difficult to acquire funding. The school operated for only three years.

== Origins ==
The Black Power Movement shaped the political climate for the Allen Building Takeover, which led to the creation of MXLU. The movement inspired the formation of Duke University's Afro-American Society (or AAS). Many Black Power activists in the American South adopted the separatist ideologies of Malcolm X. Before the Nation of Islam allegedly assassinated him in 1965, Malcolm X lent credence to militant tactics, leading to a movement for racial equality through any means necessary, including violence and self-defense. In early 1969, the AAS issued a set of over ten demands for the university's administration, most of which reflected the black students' dissatisfaction with the inadequacy of civil rights on campus. The organization negotiated at first with the university's president, Dr. Douglas Knight, who reluctantly agreed to consider the implementation of an Afro-American Studies program.

President Knight was away on a trip to procure funds for a black studies program, one of the "Black Demands", but the AAS grew impatient and decided to stage a protest. On the morning of February 13, 1969, the AAS organized an occupation of the Allen Building, the location of all the records of previous students. Knight refused to comply with some of the demands, and he issued an ultimatum to the black student protesters: the school would call the police if they did not leave. They countered by threatening to burn the university's records if police were to arrive. Later that day, a large group of white students who sympathized with the occupants congregated outside the building, so Duke called the police. The police tried to evacuate the building with tear gas, and a riot ensued. The occupants acquiesced to the administration's demands for fear of expulsion, and eventually, a trial placed forty-eight of them on probation.

The protest revealed to the black community that the administration was not sympathetic enough to its demands. After the Allen Building Takeover, some civil rights activists in Durham believed that Duke's administration did not satisfactorily address the demands of its black students, especially regarding the integration of "Afro-American studies" into its curriculum. One of these activists, Howard Fuller, conceived of building an alternative school for primarily African studies whose administration and student body would be predominantly black. He was able to do this by working with The Foundation for Community Development, and its executive director, Nathan T. Garrett. He listed a fifteen-member board of trustees, which included Bertie Howard, Sandra Philpot and Timothy Harris, in the charter. They were all residents of Durham.

Donations allowed Howard Fuller to begin building MXLU. James Forman, the spokesman of the Black Economic Development Conference (or BEDC), wrote a document called the "Black Manifesto" demanding reparations from whites for certain projects benefiting the black community, including black universities. The BEDC published it, asking for $500 million from white churches and synagogues. In accord with the "Black Manifesto", the diocese of the North Carolina Episcopal Church gave Fuller $45,000, and several anonymous sources donated smaller amounts of money. However, the donation was an outrage to some white members of the church, and the resulting controversy made further donations unlikely. The school had only $12,000 left by November 15, so Fuller sought other sources of revenue. He set up fundraising campaigns in major American cities: Los Angeles, San Francisco, Detroit, Houston, Washington D.C., New York City, Pittsburgh, Chicago, and Atlanta. However, he could not extend the school's budget beyond $82,000, the total amount of donations he received. The tuition for MXLU was $300 per year, and financial aid was available, but the school expected students who could pay more to pay more. Admissions staff interviewed applicants, and about fifty students enrolled. Most of them were political activists in their previous schools who were expelled for their involvement in protests. The school held its opening ceremony on October 25, 1969, and classes began two days after the inauguration. The administration formally named itself the "Council of Elders" soon after the school opened.

One of the students who was admitted into Malcolm X Liberation University in November 1972 but stayed there only briefly before going to school in Michigan was Godfrey Mwakikagile from Tanzania as he explained in his books, Relations Between Africans and African Americans: Misconceptions, Myths and Realities and Reflections on Race Relations: A Personal Odyssey. He became a renowned African studies scholar specializing in post-colonial studies and wrote many non-fiction academic books on African history, politics and economics among other subjects. He stated that he sought admission to Malcolm X Liberation University from Owusu Sadaukai, the school's founder and president, whom he met in Dar es Salaam, Tanzania, when Sadaukai visited Tanzania in 1972, a few months before Mwakikagile left for the United States.

== Administration ==
MXLU moved to a different location a year after it opened. For the 1969-70 academic year, MXLU was located on 426-428 East Pettigrew Street in Durham, NC. Then, in October 1970, it moved to 708 Asheboro Street (now known as Martin Luther King Drive) in Greensboro, NC. The school needed to relocate due to the construction of the Durham Freeway through the district of Hayti. Nonetheless, the school cited the reason for the move as accommodating more students. MXLU chose Greensboro because of the city's higher political activity and historical significance as a hotspot for sit-ins during the 1960s.

Initially, fifty-one students enrolled at MXLU. After moving to Greensboro, sixty-five students from seventeen states attended the school, but by the end of the third year, only two dozen students remained. Numerous expulsions contributed to the drastic decline in the student population.

MXLU grew much of its own food and made efforts in community outreach. At first, the school required female students to prepare their own meals. After a few months, both men and women received meals from two local restaurants. Teachers operated the Early Educational Center for preschool children in the community and the Children of Africa program for older youth. The school was associated with the Young African Warriors program and Willie Grimes Community School. At one point, Fuller tried to expand the school by buying the Sedalia campus of the Palmer Memorial Institute, "a black prep school founded by Charlotte Hawkins Brown in 1902", which was failing due to financial problems. However, he was unsuccessful because a trustee of the Palmer Memorial Institute resigned in protest. Then, a petition by a biracial interest group against the sale ensued, and it eventually put an end to the transaction.

== Curriculum ==
The school's goals centered on the concept of Black Power and Pan-Africanism. Initially, Fuller designed MXLU's curriculum with two different types of courses. For the first ten months, students took courses in nation-building: independent african civilization, slavery, neo-colonialism, colonialism, and independent african world; Swahili, French, and Spanish for foreign languages; and other courses for physical education. Then, students and faculty would stay in Africa for two months, followed by areas of concentration. Student would have up to ten months to complete the technical courses in order to pursue careers as the following: "food scientists, tailors, architects, engineers, medics, cadre leaders, communications technicians, physical developers, teachers, black expressionists, administrators, and linguists." Finally, MXLU would grant students internships so that they could practice their respective fields before graduating after the fourth year.

After moving to Greensboro, the MXLU program was changed to three years. The first year would consist of mandatory courses in the following areas: history, development of black political thought in the U.S., language, culture expression, speech, physical development, and a series of year-long seminars. The school also offered only foreign African languages during the first year: Swahili, Hausa, and Yoruba, one of which would be required, and another permitted to count as an elective. In the second year, students received training in one of the following technical fields: communication, technology, engineering, food science, bio-medicine, and pre-school education. Students would graduate after teaching at the school in their last year. The school advertised that it offered agriculture, bio-medicine, communications technology, and three engineering options—construction, electrical, and mechanical. According to Fuller, these areas of expertise would prepare a student "to contribute to African people in the U.S. or on the Continent of Africa." In an article in The Philadelphia Tribune, MXLU staffer Jim Grant described the school's curriculum in detail. According to Grant, MXLU's students did not get weekends off unless there was an emergency. They spent two hours on "physical development" every morning, which includes a three-mile run. Each student must devote eighteen hours every week to focus on his or her skill area and "eight hours in selective technology." The remaining time, students studied and performed physical labor.

MXLU's leaders claimed that an MXLU education aligned with the idea of Pan-Africanism. Grant summarized the tenets of Pan-Africanism as the following:

1. All black people are considered as misplaced Africans.
2. All black people everywhere are linked historically by a common heritage and common oppression.
3. Land is necessary for the control of the destinies of all African people. This can only be brought about by the development of a strong and unified Africa.
4. An economic system must be set up which reflects traditional communalism transformed to fit modern technological advances and fair distribution of wealth and responsibility.
5. True freedom can only come about through the destruction of capitalism, colonialism, imperialism, neo-colonialism, and white European nationalism.

== Experimental pedagogy ==
Malcolm X Liberation University was a novel experiment in higher education. A document in the Cleveland Sellers Jr. Papers in the Avery Institute College of Charleston highlighted the primary goal of the new school: "The existing system of education does not respond to the needs of the Black community; it does not provide an ideological or practical methodology for meeting the physical, social, psychological, economic and cultural needs of Black people. Malcolm X Liberation University is a direct response to this vacuum." Furthermore, most universities in America based admissions on standardized test scores, such as the SAT. MXLU, on the other hand, challenged this notion by affirming that "any black person who accepted the goals and objectives of MXLU" would be eligible to apply. The school's administrators could not come to a consensus over the definition of these goals, and internal ideological disputes divided the school into factions, ultimately leading to its demise.

MXLU's curriculum challenged the traditional American education system in several ways. Most universities assess students based on their scores on classwork and tests, but MXLU encouraged educators to reexamine the effectiveness of an academic grading system. For example, the school allowed students to apply their knowledge to a greater degree, including in Africa. Since teachers would travel to Africa with the students, teachers evaluated students on whether their projects were successful. Consequently, students did not receive grades. Instead, they could only graduate after demonstrating proficiency in community involvement.

By mostly accepting black students to promote Black Power, MXLU drew people's attention towards the ethicality of reverse discrimination. The school's administration anticipated criticism for reverse discrimination because MXLU mostly admitted black students and hired black staff members. In defense, the Council of Elders responded in writing, "MXLU would be open to all who desire an education which would prepare then to work with groups of black persons. Because black students are more committed to the cause of solving the problems of being black in America, the student body would be mostly black."

== Demise ==
Fuller could not garner sufficient funds after the end of 1969 because of the controversies surrounding him and MXLU's sources of funding. First, many people in the Episcopal Church criticized it for abiding by the "Black Manifesto", and they deemed Fuller guilty by association. In another instance, a rumor that Fuller used MXLU as an arsenal sprung up from an article published in a local newspaper. The reporter claimed that firefighters found guns in a school's dorm and that ammunition exploded in the fire. The name "Malcolm X" in the school's name aroused further suspicions that Fuller was planning a violent uprising against Durham's white population.

Another reason MXLU ran out of funds was that the school failed to garner support from large organizations in the South. Acceptance by larger black universities or civil rights groups was crucial because they would help not only to fund the small school, but also to defend it from criticisms of major opponents. Instead, Fuller made a series of statements that turned away many of his potential supporters. Kelly Alexander, head of the North Carolina chapter of the NAACP, did not support MXLU because he believed it was too radical. Others, like Whitney Young of the National Urban League, claimed to be against the separatist motives of the school. He said: "We must not mislead our young people. We are playing for keeps. Swahili is an interesting language but we are not using it on IBM cards right now. Let's quit kidding white people that we're going to get on a boat and go back to Africa." These opponents believed integration would be necessary in order to gain social, political, and economic equality. However, during an interview on television, Fuller said: "This isn't a 'back-to-African' thing", so he did realize that Marcus Garvey's idea of moving back to Africa was unfeasible.

Political differences within the Council of Elders did not allow the administration to reach a consensus over the structure of MXLU's curriculum. According to Dr. Claude Barnes, these disparate ideologies caused the school to fall apart. The school's administrators shut out MXLU from the rest of the world so that they could shield it from the white media, but the isolation also discouraged potential donors from contributing to an institution that lacked transparency.

On June 28, 1973, Owusu Saudakai (Howard Fuller changed his name earlier) officially closed MXLU. He noted that the school would only remain open if it could meet the "'needs of the people' and that he would not keep it going 'just because it was our thing.'"

== See also ==
- Bibliography of Malcolm X
- Bibliography of Martin Luther King Jr.
