= George Esser =

American civil rights advocate

George Hyndman Esser Jr. (c. 1921 in Norton, Virginia – November 5, 2006, in Chapel Hill, North Carolina) was an American civil rights advocate who led the North Carolina Fund at the request of then-governor Terry Sanford in the 1960s.

== Career ==
After law school, he joined the Institute of Government at the University of North Carolina at Chapel Hill.

In 1963 Sanford asked Esser to run NC Fund, which in its five years established community action agencies across the state.

He brought Nathan T. Garrett to the NC Fund, and Garrett later founded he Foundation for Community Development.

Esser later was a program adviser for the Ford Foundation, executive director of the Southern Regional Council in Atlanta and executive director of the National Academy of Public Administration in Washington, D.C.

He received the North Carolina Philanthropy Award in 1995.
