= The Best of Enemies (2019 film) =

- Theatrical release poster
- Directed by: Robin Bissell
- Written by: Robin Bissell
- Based on: The Best of Enemies: Race and Redemption in the New South by Osha Gray Davidson
- Produced by: Danny Strong; Fred Bernstein; Matt Berenson; Robin Bissell; Dominique Telson; Tobey Maguire; Matthew Plouffe
- Starring: Taraji P. Henson; Sam Rockwell; Babou Ceesay; Anne Heche; Wes Bentley; Nick Searcy; Bruce McGill
- Cinematography: David Lanzenberg
- Edited by: Harry Yoon
- Music by: Marcelo Zarvos
- Production companies: Astute Films; Material Pictures
- Distributed by: STX Entertainment
- Release date: April 5, 2019
- Running time: 133 minutes
- Country: United States
- Language: English
- Budget: $10 million
- Box office: $10.2 million

The Best of Enemies is a 2019 American drama film directed and written by Robin Bissell in his feature debut. It is based on the 1996 book The Best of Enemies: Race and Redemption in the New South by Osha Gray Davidson, which focuses on the rivalry between civil rights activist Ann Atwater and Ku Klux Klan leader C. P. Ellis. The film stars Taraji P. Henson, Sam Rockwell, Babou Ceesay, Anne Heche, Wes Bentley, Bruce McGill, John Gallagher Jr., and Nick Searcy. It was released in the United States on April 5, 2019, by STX Entertainment.

== Plot ==
In 1971 in Durham, North Carolina, Ann Atwater tries to get better housing conditions for poor black people, and is ignored by the all-white judge panel. Ann's daughter's school catches on fire, causing local Ku Klux Klan president C. P. Ellis to fear that the black children will come to the white schools. Bill Riddick sets up a meeting with them both, to arrange charrettes to discuss segregation and other issues. Both refuse at first as they hate each other, but are convinced. C.P. proudly refuses to sit with Bill and Ann, since they are black and he is white.

They agree to pick some people randomly from the group to vote on the issues at the end of the meeting sessions. C.P tries to talk to these selected to vote, but is rebuffed. A black reverend asks Bill if he can play gospel music at the end of each session. C.P. refuses, saying that if the Black people want to sing gospel music at the charrette, he should be allowed to put out his KKK items on display. Ann refuses, but Bill agrees.

At one meeting, a group of black teenagers tries to destroy the KKK items, but Ann stops them and tells them to instead understand what the KKK is. C.P. observes.

Bill insists Black and White people in their group sit next to each other in the cafeteria as they eat. He makes C.P and Ann sit together alone. They eat in tense silence, then she asks him if he has a boy in Murdock. C.P. refuses to talk about his son. Murdock is a facility for disabled boys, and his son has Down syndrome.

C.P. rushes to Murdock, as his son Larry has been put in the same room with another boy who is screaming, upsetting Larry. C.P. demands that his son be placed in a room of his own, but the nurses say he can't afford it. Ann visits Larry and convinces Bernadette, who works there, to put him in his own room.

Bill takes Ann, C.P., and the rest of their group to visit the black school that was burned. C.P. is shocked by the damage. Ann's daughter says hi to Ann, but gives C.P the evil eye when she realises who he is. C.P.'s wife Mary, overjoyed with Ann's help, goes to thank her. Ann is told that C.P. has always been racist. Mary later calls C.P out when he tells her about his encounter with Ann's daughter, asking him what he expected. The encounter and Mary's words leave C.P shaken and start to question his beliefs.

The night before the final vote, C.P.'s KKK troublemaking friends threaten the selected voters to vote for segregation. When C.P. finds out, he is dismayed. Especially since one of the targets is a Vietnam vet who C.P had talked to earlier and learned that the man's manager, a black man, is also a vet and had saved his life on several occasions. When Ann hears about it, she screams at C.P., calling him a coward.

During the voting, all the issues pass, coming down to the final issue of desegregation. The voters give their vote one by one. Ann votes for it, and C.P. surprises everyone by doing the same, realizing the KKK is hateful. He also makes a speech and rips up his KKK membership card, to the fury of his watching KKK friends. They threaten him and try to set fire to his gas station but C.P. douses it. The white community shuns and boycotts his station. Ann and Bill bring in the black community to buy from him instead.

The real life Ann and C.P. went around to different cities together, to talk about their experiences. They remained friends to the end of C.P.'s life, with Ann giving the eulogy at his funeral.

== Cast ==
- Taraji P. Henson as Ann Atwater, a community organizer in Durham
- Sam Rockwell as C. P. Ellis
- Babou Ceesay as Bill Riddick
- Anne Heche as Mary Ellis
- Wes Bentley as Floyd Kelly
- Nick Searcy as Garland Keith
- Bruce McGill as Carvie Oldham
- John Gallagher Jr. as Lee Trombley
- Gilbert Glenn Brown as Howard Clement
- Nicholas Logan as Wiley Yates
- Caitlin Mehner as Maddy Mays
- Afemo Omilami as Franklin Mose
- Sope Aluko as Henrietta Kaye
- Carson Holmes as Kenneth Wade Ellis
- Tim Ware as Judge Leslie Hallford
- Ned Vaughn as Wilbur Hobby

== Production ==
In June 2015, it was announced that Taraji P. Henson and Sam Rockwell would star in a civil rights drama, an adaptation of Osha Gray Davidson's history The Best of Enemies: Race and Redemption in the New South. Robin Bissell was attached to make his directorial debut from his own script. Filming began on May 22, 2017, in Georgia. In July 2018, STX Entertainment acquired the film's domestic distribution rights. Producers on the film were Danny Strong, Fred Bernstein, Matt Berenson, Bissell, Dominique Telson, and Material Pictures' Tobey Maguire and Matthew Plouffe. The trailer was released on October 11, 2018.

== Release ==
The Best of Enemies was released in the United States on April 5, 2019, by STX Entertainment, and was released on DVD and Blu-ray on June 18, 2019.

== Reception ==
=== Box office ===
The Best of Enemies grossed $10.2 million in North America and $11,831 in other territories, against a production budget of $10 million. In the United States and Canada, The Best of Enemies was released alongside Shazam! and Pet Sematary, and was projected to gross $6–12 million from 1,705 theaters in its opening weekend. It made $1.6 million on its first day, including $265,000 from Thursday night previews. It ended up debuting to just $4.4 million, finishing sixth at the box office. The film fell 55% in its second weekend to $2 million, finishing tenth.

=== Critical response ===
On review aggregator Rotten Tomatoes, the film holds an approval rating of 51% based on 82 reviews, with an average rating of 6/10. The website's critical consensus reads, "The Best of Enemies has the best of intentions, but they're derailed by a problematic perspective and a disappointing lack of insight." On Metacritic, the film has a score of 49 out of 100, based on 25 critics, indicating "mixed or average reviews". Audiences polled by CinemaScore gave the film an average grade of "A" on an A+ to F scale, while those at PostTrak gave it an overall positive score of 82% and a "definite recommend" of 70%.
