= Taraji P. Henson =

American actress (born 1970)

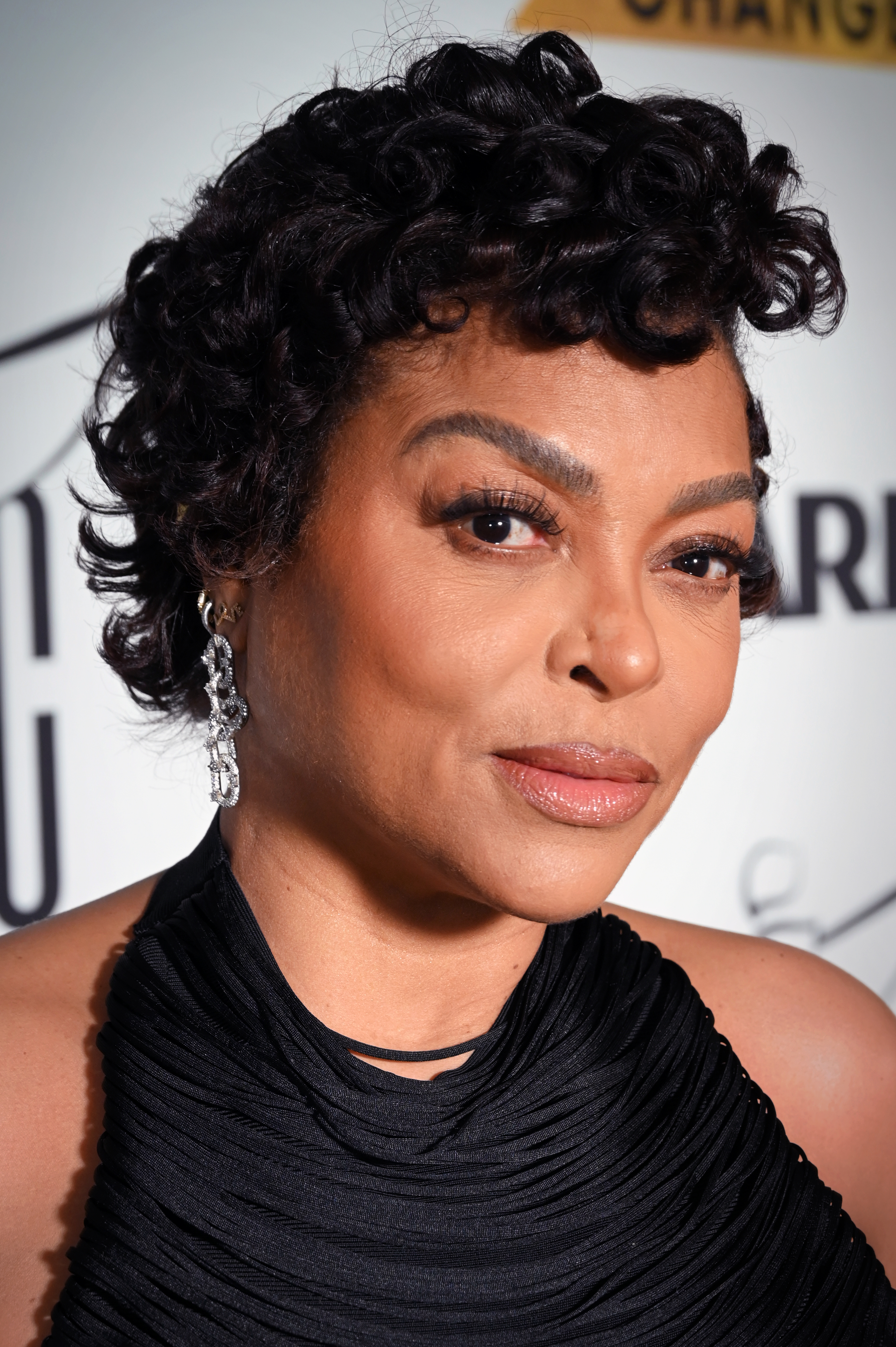
- Henson in 2026
- Born: Taraji Penda Henson; September 11, 1970 (age 56); Washington, D.C., U.S.
- Education: Howard University (BFA)
- Occupation: Actress
- Years active: 1992–present
- Partner: Kelvin Hayden (2015–2020)
- Children: 1
- Awards: Full list
- Taraji P. Henson's voice Taraji P. Henson on mental health treatment within the African American community. Recorded June 7, 2019

Taraji Penda Henson (/təˈrɑːdʒi/ tə-RAH-jee; born September 11, 1970) is an American actress, producer, author, and mental health advocate. Her accolades include a Golden Globe Award, alongside nominations for an Academy Award, six Emmy Awards, and a Tony Award. In 2016 and 2024, Time named Henson one of the 100 most influential people in the world.

After studying acting at Howard University, she made her film debut in the crime film Streetwise (1998). Henson gained recognition for playing a prostitute in Hustle & Flow (2005) and as nursing home caretaker, Queenie, in David Fincher's The Curious Case of Benjamin Button (2008). The latter earned her a nomination for the Academy Award for Best Supporting Actress. In 2016, she portrayed mathematician Katherine Johnson in Hidden Figures. She has also acted in Baby Boy (2001), The Karate Kid (2010), Think Like a Man (2012), Acrimony (2018), What Men Want (2019), The Best of Enemies (2019), and The Color Purple (2023).

Henson has also had an extensive career in television. From 2011 to 2013, she co-starred as Joss Carter in the CBS drama series Person of Interest. From 2015 to 2020, she starred as Cookie Lyon in the Fox drama series Empire, for which she won the Golden Globe Award for Best Actress – Television Series Drama and was nominated for Primetime Emmy Awards in 2015 and 2016. Her other Emmy-nominated roles were for the Lifetime movie Taken from Me: The Tiffany Rubin Story (2011) and for her guest role in the ABC sitcom Abbott Elementary (2023).

Henson also released a New York Times best selling autobiography titled Around the Way Girl in 2016. In 2019, she received a star on the Hollywood Walk of Fame.

== Early life and education ==
Taraji Penda Henson was born September 11, 1970, in Southeast Washington, D.C., the daughter of Bernice (née Gordon), a corporate manager at Woodward & Lothrop, and Boris Lawrence Henson, a janitor and metal fabricator. She has often spoken of the influence of her maternal grandmother, Patsy Ballard, who accompanied her at the Academy Awards the year she was nominated. She was raised Catholic.

Her first and middle names are of Swahili origin: Taraji ("hope") and Penda ("love"). According to a mitochondrial DNA analysis, her matrilineal lineage can be traced to the Masa people of Cameroon. She has said that North Pole explorer Matthew Henson was "the brother of [her] great-great-grandfather."

Henson graduated from Oxon Hill High School in Oxon Hill, Maryland, in 1988. She attended North Carolina Agricultural and Technical State University, where she intended to study electrical engineering, before transferring to Howard University to study drama. To pay for college, she worked mornings as a secretary at The Pentagon and evenings as a singing-dancing waitress on a dinner-cruise ship, the Spirit of Washington.

== Career ==
=== 2001–2014: Early career ===
Henson received her SAG membership card in the early 1990s for doing three roles as a background performer. Her first prominent role was in the 2001 comedy-drama film Baby Boy, where she portrayed Yvette, alongside singer Tyrese Gibson.

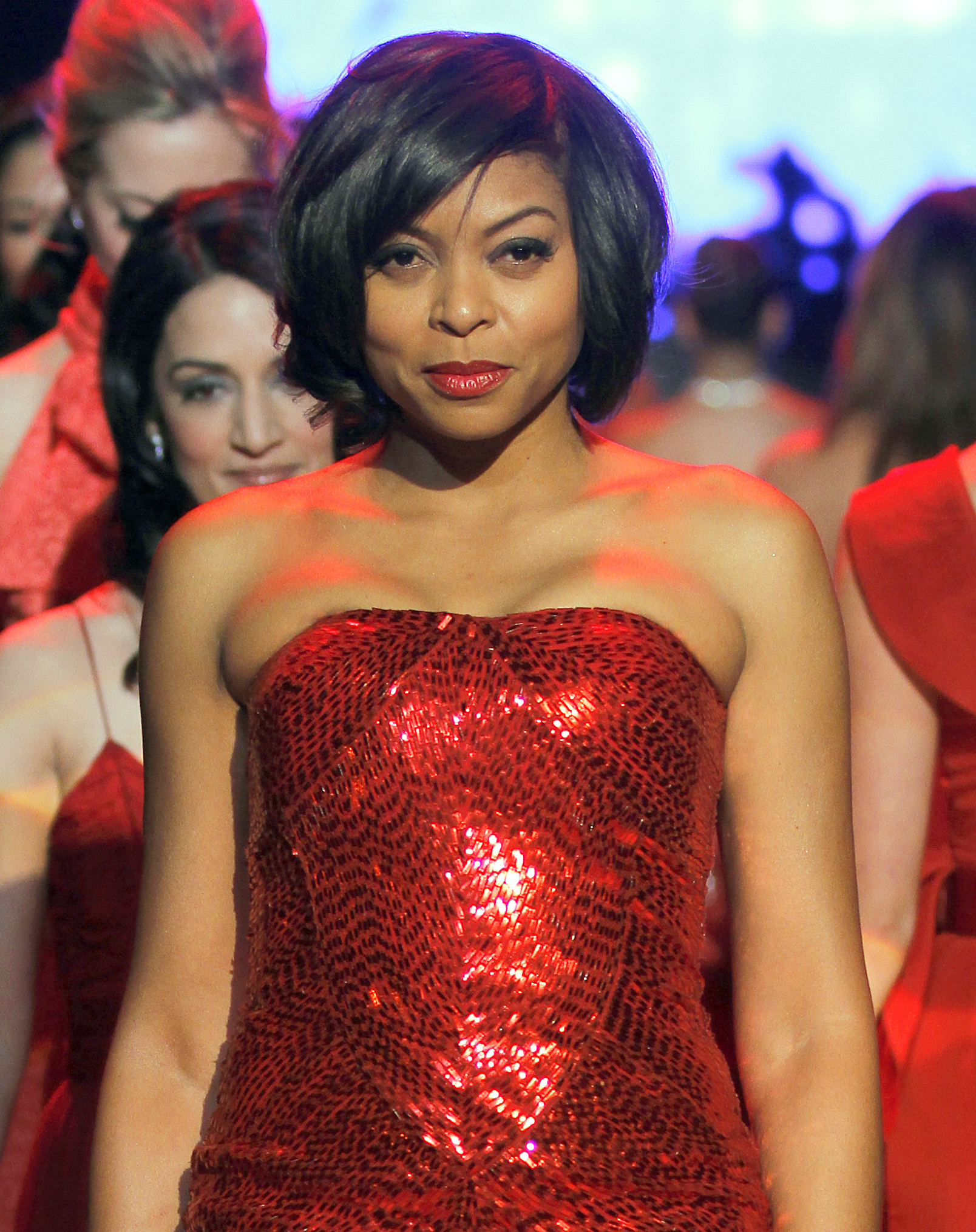
Henson in 2011

Henson has guest-starred on several television shows, including The WB's Smart Guy, the Fox series House in 2005, and CBS's CSI: Crime Scene Investigation in 2006. She also appeared in an episode of Sister, Sister. In 2005, Henson was in the independent film Hustle & Flow as Shug, the love interest of the male lead, DJay, portrayed by Terrence Howard. She made her singing debut in the film, which was nominated for two Academy Awards and won one. In 2008, she appeared with Brad Pitt in David Fincher's drama film The Curious Case of Benjamin Button, where she played Queenie, Benjamin's mother, and for which she received an Academy Award nomination for Best Supporting Actress. In an interview with Lauren Viera of The Chicago Tribune, Henson described Queenie as "the embodiment of unconditional love."

Henson acted in two Tyler Perry films, The Family That Preys in 2008 and I Can Do Bad All By Myself in 2009. In 2010, she appeared in the remake of The Karate Kid with Jaden Smith and Jackie Chan. Though reviews were lackluster, the film was a commercial success. Additionally, Henson has been a cast member on several television shows, including Lifetime's The Division and ABC's Boston Legal for one season. Her recurring characters include Angela Scott on ABC's Eli Stone. In 2011, she was cast in the CBS crime-suspense series Person of Interest. In the November 20, 2013, episode, "The Crossing", after co-starring for two and a half years, Henson's character, 'Joss' Carter was killed as part of the series' new storyline.

In 2011, Henson starred as Tiffany Rubin in the Lifetime Movie Network film Taken from Me: The Tiffany Rubin Story. It was based on true events in the life of a New York woman whose son, Kobe, was abducted by his biological father to South Korea. Her portrayal of Rubin received positive reviews and earned her several award nominations, including a Primetime Emmy Award for Outstanding Lead Actress in a Miniseries or a Movie. In 2012, Henson was in the large ensemble cast film Think Like a Man, based on Steve Harvey's 2009 book Act Like a Lady, Think Like a Man. She reprised the role in the film's sequel, Think Like a Man Too, released in June 2014.

=== 2015–present: Empire and beyond ===
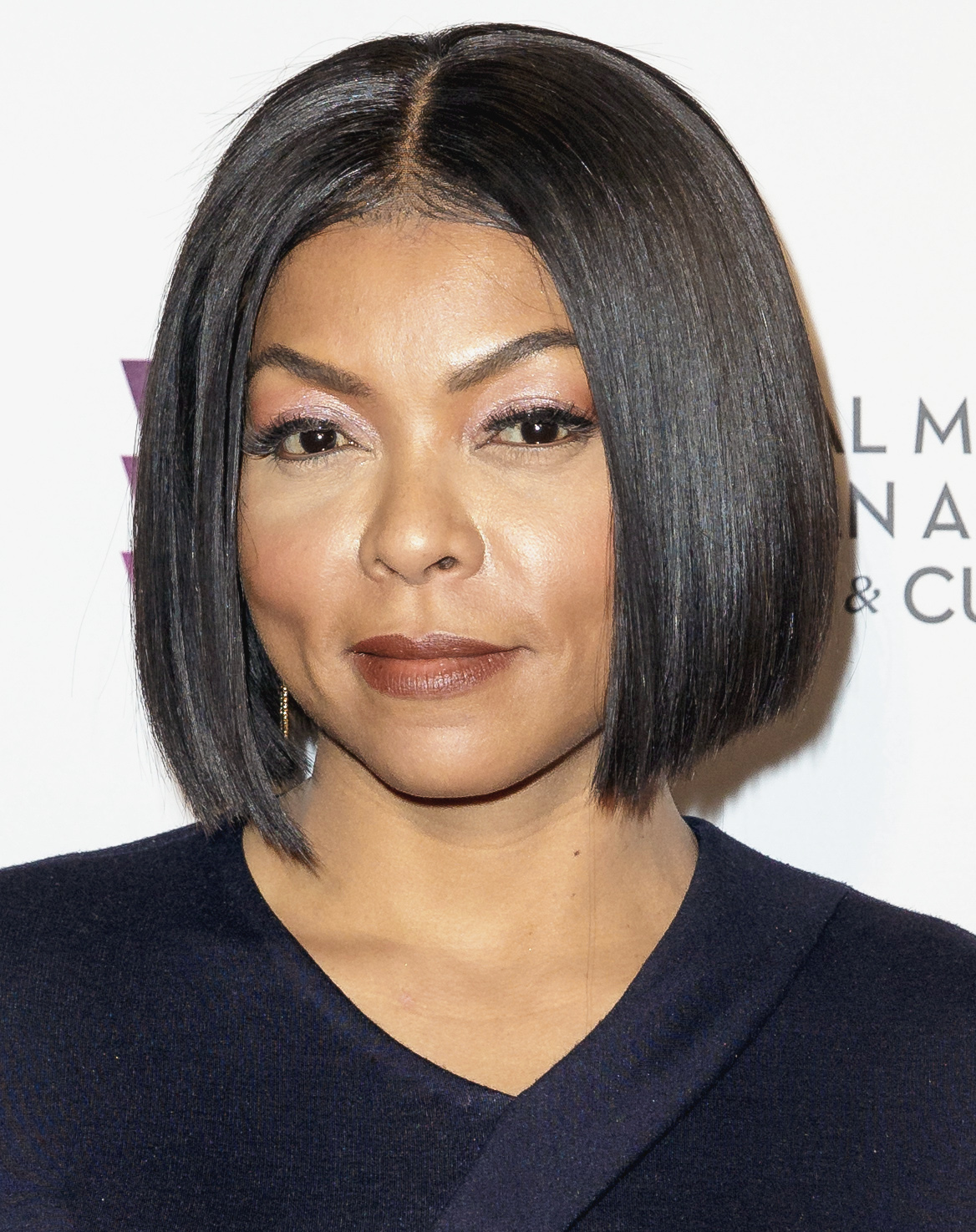
Henson in 2016

In 2015, Henson was cast to headline in the Fox series Empire, a musical drama set in the hip hop recording industry, where she plays Cookie Lyon opposite former Hustle & Flow costar Terrence Howard. Fox ordered the pilot in May 2014, and the series debuted on January 7, 2015, with positive critical reviews and wide commercial success. The role brought Henson widespread recognition and critical acclaim. In July 2015, she was nominated for the Primetime Emmy Award for Outstanding Lead Actress in a Drama Series, and submitted the show's pilot for Emmy voting, for which she became the first African-American woman to win the Critics' Choice Television Award for Best Actress in a Drama Series. In January 2016, she won the Golden Globe Award for Best Actress – Television Series Drama for Empire, becoming only the third African-American actress to take home the award after Gail Fisher (1972) and Regina Taylor (1992). At the 46th NAACP Image Awards, she was named the 2015 Entertainer of the Year for her roles in Empire and No Good Deed.

In 2015, Henson teamed up with Howard to produce and host a variety holiday special for Fox, Taraji and Terrence's White Hot Holidays. The special was produced again in 2016 and 2017, without Howard. In 2016, Henson starred in the biographical drama film Hidden Figures, a major box-office success nominated for numerous awards, including three Oscars (Best Picture, Best Adapted Screenplay, and Best Supporting Actress for Octavia Spencer) and two Golden Globes (Best Supporting Actress for Spencer and Best Original Score). It won the Screen Actors Guild Award for Outstanding Performance by a Cast in a Motion Picture.

In January 2018, she starred in Sony Screen Gems's thriller-drama film Proud Mary, as a hit woman whose life is turned around when she meets a young boy who awakens the maternal instinct she never knew she had. In March, she starred in the film Tyler Perry's Acrimony as a faithful wife who, after tiring of standing by her husband, is enraged when she believes herself betrayed. In November, she voiced the character Yesss in Disney's Ralph Breaks the Internet, a sequel to the studio's Wreck-It Ralph.

In February 2019, Henson starred in What Men Want (based on the 2000 Mel Gibson romantic comedy What Women Want) as a female sports agent, looked down upon by male colleagues, who gains the power to hear men's thoughts. In April 2019, she starred in the historical drama The Best of Enemies, portraying civil rights activist Ann Atwater.

In July 2020, it was reported that a spin-off Empire series focusing on Henson's character, Cookie Lyon, was in development, with Henson producing and starring, as part of Henson's two-year first-look deal with 20th Century Fox Television through her production company, TPH Entertainment. The deal includes developing projects for the network across multiple platforms. Henson said she hopes to tackle a number of sensitive topics while cultivating young, fresh voices. FOX decided to not move forward with the spin-off, currently putting the series on hold. In December 2020, Henson began hosting the talk show Peace of Mind with Taraji on Facebook Watch.

On December 2, 2021, Henson played the role of Miss Hannigan in Annie Live! on NBC.

Henson also portrayed Shug Avery in the 2023 film The Color Purple acting alongside Danielle Brooks, who portrayed Sofia. The film was released on December 25, 2023.

In 2026, Henson competed in season fourteen of The Masked Singer as "Scarab". She was eliminated on "Clueless Night" alongside Tone Loc as "Handyman". Henson later returned as a guest panelist for "Spice Girls Night" in the same season.

Henson made her Broadway debut as Bertha Holly in a revival of the August Wilson play Joe Turner's Come and Gone, directed by Debbie Allen. Previews began on March 30, 2026 and the play began performances April 25, 2026.

== Other work ==
Henson made her singing debut in the film Hustle & Flow, where she provided the vocals for the Three 6 Mafia track "It's Hard out Here for a Pimp". The song won an Academy Award for Best Original Song in 2006, giving Three 6 Mafia the distinction of becoming the first African-American hip hop act to win in that category. Henson and the group performed the song at the live Oscar ceremony on March 5, 2006. She also sang "In My Daughter's Eyes" on the 2006 charity album Unexpected Dreams – Songs From the Stars.

Henson has made several appearances in music videos and television. In 2005, she starred in the rapper Common's music video "Testify" as the wife of a soon-to-be-convicted murderer, and appeared in Tyrese Gibson's music video "Stay" as his love interest. On March 16, 2015, she was a guest co-host on Live! with Kelly and Michael, filling in for Kelly Ripa.

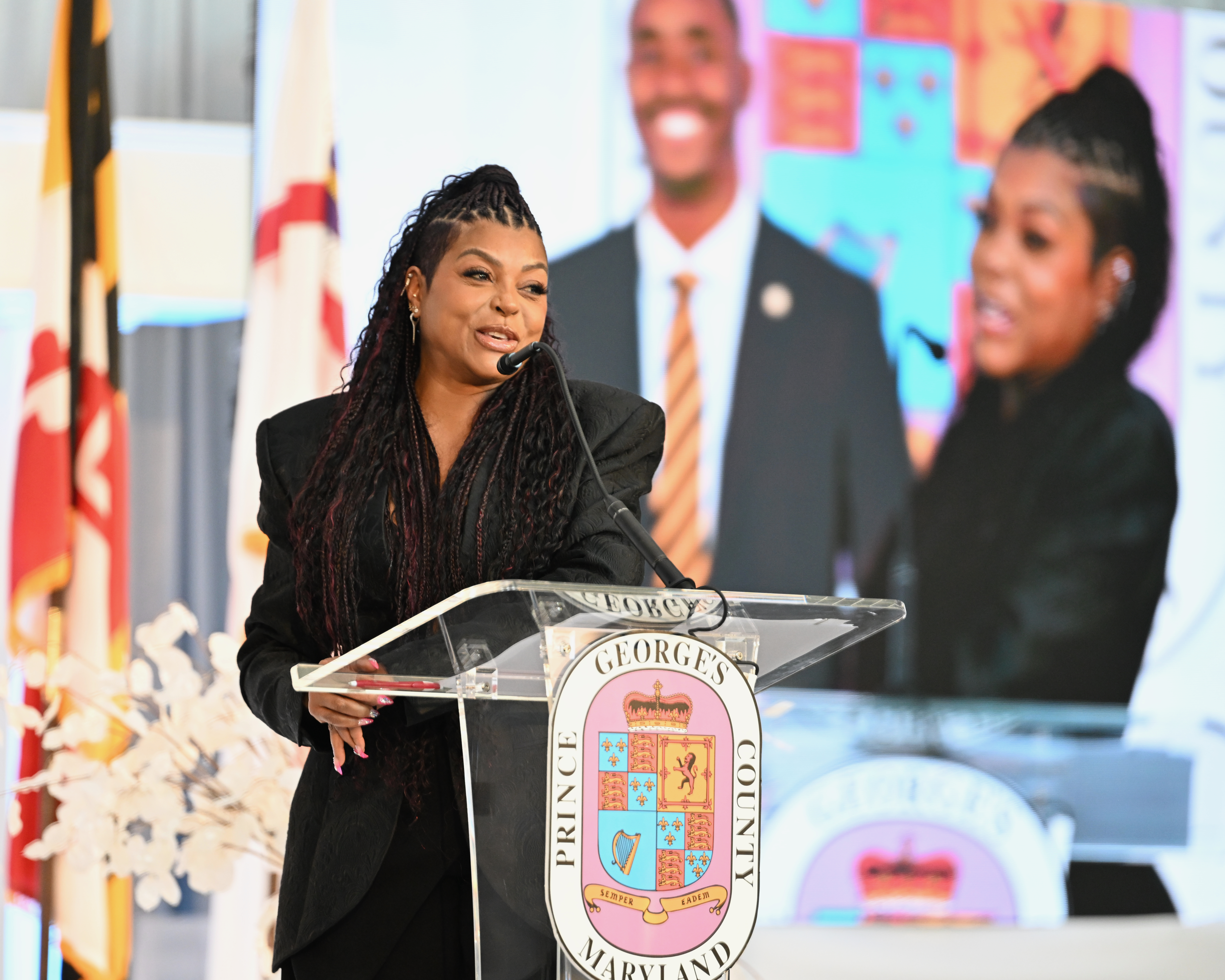
Henson speaks at the inauguration of Prince George's County Executive Aisha Braveboy, 2025

Henson collaborated with MAC Cosmetics to create the Taraji P. Henson makeup collection in late August 2016. The #MACTaraji collection debuted the following month. In November 2016, she again collaborated with MAC as the spokesperson for their Viva Glam Campaign, along with Jussie Smollett, to benefit the MAC HIV/AIDS fund. Their collection debuted in February 2017.

Henson has appeared in a few stage roles, including a production of August Wilson's Joe Turner's Come and Gone and the Pasadena Playhouse's Above the Fold. She also started The Boris Lawrence Henson Foundation. Named after her father, it deals with cultural mental illness.

On April 1, 2022, Henson was appointed by President Joe Biden to the President's Board of Advisors on Historically Black Colleges and Universities.

In June 2025, Henson spoke at the inauguration of Aisha Braveboy as county executive of Prince George's County, Maryland.

== Personal life ==
In 1994, Henson gave birth to her son, Marcell. His father, Henson's high-school sweetheart William LaMarr Johnson, was murdered in 2003. In 2014, Henson said that her son had been racially profiled by police and that his car had been illegally searched during a traffic stop in Glendale, California. A video obtained by the Los Angeles Times showed Marcell had driven through a lighted crosswalk while a pedestrian was crossing, given verbal consent to search his vehicle, and admitted to smoking marijuana two hours before driving. Hashish oil and marijuana were found inside the car. Forty minutes after the video was made public, Henson said in an Instagram message, "I would like to publicly apologize to the officer and the Glendale Police Department. A mother's job is not easy, and neither is a police officer's."

A supporter of People for the Ethical Treatment of Animals (PETA), Henson appeared nude in an ad for the I'd Rather Be Naked Than Wear Fur campaign in January 2011. She joined PETA again for their 2013 campaign, "Be an Angel for Animals", where Henson posed with her family dog Uncle Willie. "Chained dogs suffer day in and day out," the ad stated. "They are cold, hungry, thirsty, vulnerable, and lonely. Keep them inside, where it's safe and warm."

Henson posed nude for the May issue of Allure magazine in 2012. In February 2015, Henson was featured in an ad for the NOH8 Campaign supporting the LGBT community. In late 2017, she switched to a vegan diet.

On May 13, 2018, Henson was engaged to former NFL player Kelvin Hayden. She disclosed the end of their engagement during an episode of The Breakfast Club on October 19, 2020.

Henson is a Christian and considers acting to be a spiritual experience.

== Awards and nominations ==
Henson has received many accolades for her work in film and television. In 2015, Henson won the Critics' Choice Television Award for Best Actress in a Drama Series (for Empire), and became the first black actress in the history of the awards to do so. She also won a Golden Globe in the same category for the series. Additionally, Henson has received nominations for the Academy Award for Best Supporting Actress (for The Curious Case of Benjamin Button), multiple Screen Actors Guild Awards (winning Outstanding Motion Picture Cast in 2017 for Hidden Figures) and three Primetime Emmy Awards (for Taken from Me: The Tiffany Rubin Story and Empire).

== Filmography ==
=== Film ===
| Year | Title | Role | Notes |
|---|---|---|---|
| 1998 | Streetwise | Tammy | |
| 2000 | The Adventures of Rocky and Bullwinkle | Left-Wing Student | |
| 2001 | All or Nothing | Kiko | Video |
| 2001 | Baby Boy | Yvette | |
| 2002 | Book of Love | Date #4/Ghetto Girl | |
| 2004 | Hair Show | Tiffany | |
| 2005 | Hustle & Flow | Shug | |
| 2005 | Four Brothers | Camille Mercer | |
| 2005 | Animal | Ramona | Video |
| 2006 | Something New | Nedra | |
| 2006 | Smokin' Aces | Sharice Watters | |
| 2007 | Talk to Me | Vernell Watson | |
| 2008 | The Family That Preys | Pam Evans | |
| 2008 | The Curious Case of Benjamin Button | Queenie | |
| 2009 | Not Easily Broken | Clarice Clark-Johnson | |
| 2009 | I Can Do Bad All by Myself | April Jones | |
| 2009 | Hurricane Season | Dayna Collins | |
| 2010 | Date Night | Detective Arroyo | |
| 2010 | Once Fallen | Pearl | |
| 2010 | The Karate Kid | Sherry Parker | |
| 2010 | Peep World | Mary | |
| 2011 | The Good Doctor | Nurse Theresa | |
| 2011 | Larry Crowne | B'Ella | |
| 2011 | From the Rough | Catana Starks | |
| 2012 | Think Like a Man | Lauren Harris | |
| 2013 | Madly Madagascar | Okapi | Voice, direct-to-video |
| 2014 | Think Like a Man Too | Lauren Harris | |
| 2014 | Top Five | Herself | |
| 2014 | No Good Deed | Terri Granger | |
| 2016 | Term Life | Samantha Thurman | |
| 2016 | Hidden Figures | Katherine Johnson | |
| 2018 | Proud Mary | Mary Goodwin | |
| 2018 | Acrimony | Melinda Gayle | |
| 2018 | Ralph Breaks the Internet | Yesss | Voice |
| 2019 | What Men Want | Ali Davis | |
| 2019 | The Best of Enemies | Ann Atwater | |
| 2020 | Coffee & Kareem | Vanessa Manning | |
| 2022 | Minions: The Rise of Gru | Belle Bottom | Voice |
| 2023 | Paw Patrol: The Mighty Movie | Victoria Vance | Voice |
| 2023 | The Color Purple | Shug Avery | |
| 2025 | Straw | Janiyah Wiltkinson | |
| 2026 | Why Did I Get Married Again? | Roselyn | |
| 2026 | Give Me Some Sugah | Lenore Lindsey | Post-production |

=== Television ===
| Year | Title | Role | Notes |
|---|---|---|---|
| 1997 | The Parent 'Hood | Aida | Episode: "Fast Cash" |
| 1997 | Sister, Sister | Briana | Episode: "Two's Company" |
| 1997–98 | Smart Guy | Monique/Leslie | Guest cast (seasons 2–3) |
| 1998 | ER | Patrice Robbins/Elan | Guest cast (seasons 4–5) |
| 1998 | Saved by the Bell: The New Class | Girl #3 | Episode: "Loser" |
| 1998–99 | Felicity | R.A. #2/Art Student | Episode: "Drawing the Line Part 1" & "Todd Mulcahy Part 2" |
| 1999 | Pacific Blue | Rhonda | Episode: "The Right Thing" |
| 2000 | Strong Medicine | Crystal | Episode: "Drug Interactions" |
| 2000 | Satan's School for Girls | Paige | Television film |
| 2001 | The Test | Herself/Panelist | Episode: "The Friendship Test" |
| 2001 | Murder She Wrote: The Last Free Man | Bess Pinckney | Television film |
| 2002–04 | The Division | Inspector Raina Washington | Main cast (seasons 2–4) |
| 2004 | The Drop | Herself | Episode: "Pitbull ft Lil Jon/Taraji" |
| 2004 | All of Us | Kim | Episode: "In Through the Out Door" |
| 2005 | Half & Half | Gabrielle | Episode: "The Big How to Do & Undo It Episode" |
| 2005 | House | Moira | Episode: "Spin" |
| 2006 | CSI: Crime Scene Investigation | Christina | Episode: "I Like to Watch" |
| 2007–08 | Boston Legal | Whitney Rome | Main cast (season 4) |
| 2008 | Eli Stone | Angela Scott | Recurring cast (season 2) |
| 2009–10 | Soul Train Music Awards | Herself/Co-Host | Television specials |
| 2010 | The Cleveland Show | Chanel Williams | Voice, episode: "Brotherly Love" |
| 2011 | Taken from Me: The Tiffany Rubin Story | Tiffany Rubin | Television film |
| 2011–15 | Person of Interest | Detective Jocelyn "Joss" Carter | Main cast (seasons 1–3), guest cast (season 4) |
| 2013 | The 365Black Awards | Herself/Host | Television special |
| 2014 | Hollywood Game Night | Herself | Episode: "Clue Boom-Boom Pow" |
| 2014 | Seasons of Love | Jackie | Television film |
| 2015 | Unsung Hollywood | Herself | Episode: "Baby Boy" |
| 2015 | Saturday Night Live | Herself/Host | Episode: "Taraji P. Henson/Mumford & Sons" |
| 2015 | Guys Choice Awards | Herself/Host | Television special |
| 2015 | Taraji and Terrence's White Hot Holidays | Herself/Co-Host | Television special |
| 2015 | Lip Sync Battle | Herself/Competitor | Episode: "Terrence Howard vs. Taraji P. Henson" |
| 2015–20 | Empire | Loretha "Cookie" Lyon | Main cast |
| 2016 | Ice Age: The Great Egg-Scapade | Ethel | Voice, television film |
| 2016 | Celebration of Gospel | Herself/Host | Television special |
| 2016–17 | Taraji's White Hot Holidays | Herself/Host | Television specials |
| 2017 | Carpool Karaoke: The Series | Herself | Episode: "John Legend and Alicia Keys" |
| 2017 | The Simpsons | Praline | Voice, episode: "The Great Phatsby" |
| 2018 | Lip Sync Battle | Herself/Competitor | Episode: "A Michael Jackson Celebration" |
| 2018 | D'Astrain No Cinema | Herself | Episode: "Review de "Ralph Breaks the Internet" |
| 2018 | Nick Jr. Bedtime Stories | Herself/Storyteller | Episode: "A Snowy Day" |
| 2019 | My Houzz | Herself | Episode: "'Empire' Star Taraji P. Henson Gives Stepmom a Remodel" |
| 2019 | Tuca & Bertie | Terry | Voice, episode: "Sweetbeak" |
| 2020 | American Music Awards | Herself/Host | Television special |
| 2020 | Jacked | Herself/Host | Television special |
| 2020–21 | Peace of Mind with Taraji | Herself/Host | Television special |
| 2021 | Nickelodeon's Unfiltered | Herself | Episode: "As Seen On Burrito" |
| 2021 | Soul of a Nation | Herself | Episode: "Black Joy" |
| 2021 | Legendary | Herself/Guest Judge | Episode: "Pop Tart" |
| 2021 | Project Runway | Herself/Guest Judge | Episode: "If You Got It, Haunt It" |
| 2021 | Muppets Haunted Mansion | Constance Hatchaway | Television film |
| 2021 | Annie Live! | Miss Hannigan | Television film |
| 2021–22 | BET Awards | Herself/Host | Television special |
| 2022 | RuPaul's Drag Race | Herself/Guest Judge | Episode: "Glamazon Prime" |
| 2022–23 | That's My Jam | Herself | 2 episodes |
| 2023 | Celebrity Prank Wars | Herself | Episode: "Taraji P Henson V. Fantasia" |
| 2023 | America in Black | Herself | Episode: "Taraji P. Henson, Chloe Bailey and Will Packer" |
| 2023-2025 | Abbott Elementary | Vanetta Teagues | Guest cast (season 2 & 5) |
| 2024 | Fight Night: The Million Dollar Heist | Vivian Thomas | Miniseries |
| 2026 | The Masked Singer Season 14 | Scarab; Contestant; Guest Panelist | 3 episodes |

=== Documentary ===
| Year | Title |
|---|---|
| 2011 | Bowl of Dreams |
| 2011 | Kevin Hart: Laugh at My Pain |
| 2011 | Mama & Me |
| 2021 | Mary J. Blige's My Life |
| 2023 | Going to Mars: The Nikki Giovanni Project |

=== Theatre ===
| Year | Title | Role | Director | Theatre |
|---|---|---|---|---|
| 2026 | Joe Turner's Come and Gone | Bertha Holly | Debbie Allen | Ethel Barrymore Theatre |

=== Music videos ===
| Year | Song | Artist |
|---|---|---|
| 2005 | "Testify" | Common |
| 2008 | "Just Like Me" | Jamie Foxx featuring T.I. |
| 2011 | "Stay" | Tyrese |
| 2020 | "Body" | Megan Thee Stallion |
| 2023 | "Jealousy" | Offset & Cardi B |
