= Cedric G. Johnson =

American political scientist

Cedric G. Johnson is professor of Black Studies and Political Science at the University of Illinois at Chicago.

== Career ==
In 1992, he received a BA in Political Science from Southern University. In 1994, an MA in Black Studies from The Ohio State University, in 1997, an MA in Government & Politics from the University of Maryland-College Park, and in 2001, a PhD in Government & Politics from the University of Maryland-College Park.

In 2008, his book Revolutionaries to Race Leaders was named the W.E.B. DuBois Outstanding Book of the Year by the National Conference of Black Political Scientists.

== Books ==
- The Panthers Can't Save Us Now (Verso, 2022)
- Revolutionaries to Race Leaders: Black Power and the Making of African American Politics (University of Minnesota Press, 2007)

=== Editor ===
- The Neoliberal Deluge: Hurricane Katrina, Late Capitalism and the Remaking of New Orleans (University of Minnesota Press, 2011)
