= North Carolina Fund =

The North Carolina Fund was a series of experimental programs conceived at the request of North Carolina governor Terry Sanford, who was aided by the writer John Ehle. Its director, George Esser, was appointed in 1963. It was created as a non-profit corporation to operate for five years only, with a mandate to create experimental projects in education, health, job training, housing, and community development.

During the summers of 1964 and 1965, the North Carolina Volunteers Program created teams of African-American and white college students to work together and show that communities could be stronger if their members reached across lines of race and class to solve problems of poverty. At the core, it aimed to lessen minority poverty all across North Carolina and to further the cause of civil rights.

Also by example, the North Carolina Fund served as a model and catalyst for such national programs as Head Start, VISTA, and the Community Action movement.

== Creation ==
Feeling that his education program had spent most of his political capital in the legislature, North Carolina Governor Terry Sanford began seeking private support to fund anti-poverty efforts in the state. While traveling across the state to promote his education plan, Sanford came to be of the belief that much of the poverty in North Carolina was due to racial discrimination and the lack of economic opportunity for blacks. He thus concluded that any anti-poverty plan he created would have to address economic problems for both blacks and whites. In the summer of 1962 he met John Ehle, a novelist and professor whom he quickly took on as an adviser on public policy. With Ehle he met with leaders of the Ford Foundation, a private philanthropic organization, and discussed a variety of issues with them, including anti-poverty efforts. He also established contact with George Esser, an academic at UNC-Chapel Hill's Institute of Government, to ask him for potential uses of Ford Foundation funds in combating poverty. Sanford's aides organized a three-day tour of North Carolina in January 1963 for Ford Foundation leaders to convince them to fund an anti-poverty project. Sanford's attempts to devise a plan became increasingly urgent over the following months, as civil rights activists intensified their calls for racial equality and the prospects of a white backlash grew. He worked to secure the support of the Z. Smith Reynolds Foundation and the Mary Reynolds Babcock Foundation, two smaller North Carolina philanthropic organizations, to bolster proposed grants from the Ford Foundation, and tapped the advice of John H. Wheeler, leader of the black business community in Durham. He also invited officials from the U.S. Department of Health, Education, and Welfare to come to North Carolina to work on coordinating federal efforts with the state project.

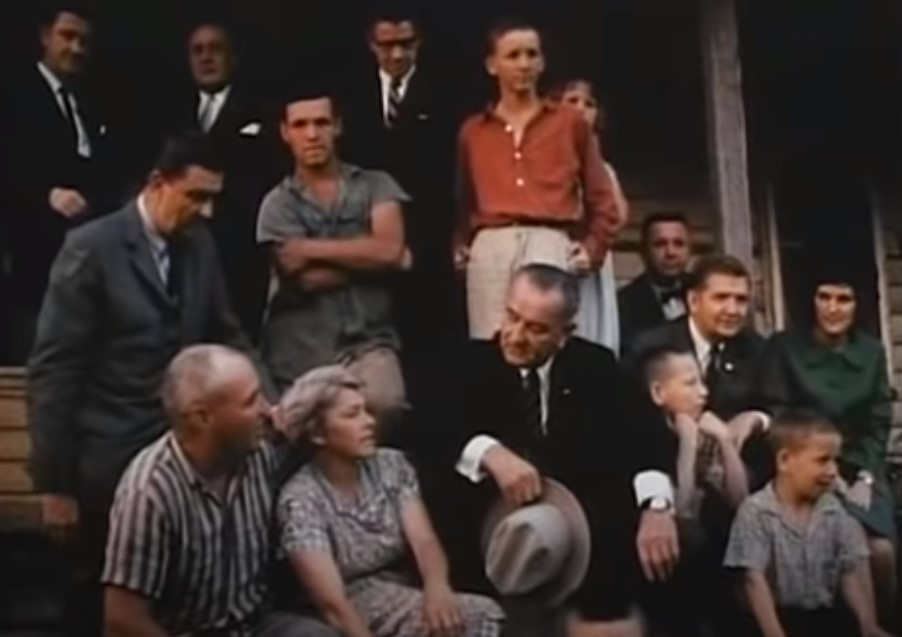
Sanford with President Lyndon B. Johnson on one of his "poverty tours" in Nash County, May 1964

In July 1963 the Ford Foundation committed $7 million to support an anti-poverty project in North Carolina. With additional grants from the other foundations, on July 18 Sanford, Wheeler, Charlie Babcock (a board member of the Mary Reynolds Babcock Foundation), and C. A. McKnight (the editor of The Charlotte Observer) incorporated the North Carolina Fund. Its goals were to fight poverty and promote racial equality across the state. Since the North Carolina Fund was backed by private organizations and not financed by the state, it could be more flexible in addressing social issues while also avoiding political opposition from segregationists. Sanford was made chairman of the Fund's board. He publicly announced its creation at a press conference on September 30, garnering a positive reception from state newspapers. The organization had a racially integrated staff—which was unusual at the time—and consulted the local residents it aimed to assist.

== Operations ==
The Fund launched a program that utilized team teaching and provided for teacher aides, which was studied by President Lyndon B. Johnson's administration and used as a model for Head Start. The Fund also supported eleven additional anti-poverty programs under another initiative which included the establishment of day care facilities and job training courses. These were also evaluated by the Johnson administration when it developed its War on Poverty programs. Sanford himself was disappointed by Johnson's war on poverty and the agency responsible for it, the Office of Economic Opportunity, and told federal officials that the goal of their effort should not be to eliminate poverty—which Sanford thought impossible—as much as it should be to reduce the "causes of poverty." Johnson administration officials considered placing Sanford in charge of the office.

One of the North Carolina Fund's prominent programs was Operation Breakthrough (Durham, North Carolina), an organization in Durham.

The Fund ceased operations in 1969.

== Works cited ==
- Covington, Howard E. Jr; Ellis, Marion A. (1999). Terry Sanford: Politics, Progress, and Outrageous Ambitions. Durham: Duke University Press. ISBN 9780822323563.
- Eamon, Tom (2014). The Making of a Southern Democracy: North Carolina Politics from Kerr Scott to Pat McCrory. Chapel Hill: University of North Carolina Press. ISBN 9781469606972. - See profile at Google Books
- Goldsmith, William D. (2018). Educating for a New Economy: The Struggle to Redevelop a Jim Crow State, 1960–2000 (PDF) (PhD thesis). Duke University.
- Korstad, Robert Rogers; Leloudis, James L. (2010). To right these wrongs: the North Carolina Fund and the battle to end poverty and inequality in 1960s America. Chapel Hill: University of North Carolina Press. ISBN 9780807871140.
