= Charrette =

Intense period of design or planning activity

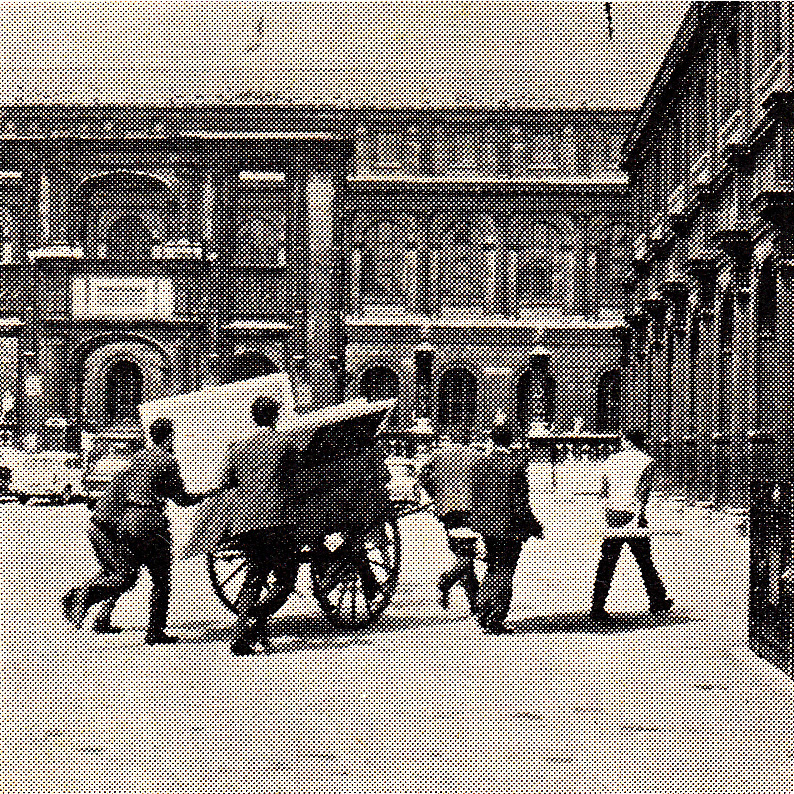
Arrival of a cart in the courtyard of the Beaux-Arts, Gazette-St-Germain-des-Prés, Sept. 1965

A charrette (American pronunciation: /ʃɑːˈrɛt/; French: [ʃaʁɛt]), often Anglicized to charette or charet and sometimes called a design charrette, is an intense period of design or planning activity.

The word charrette may refer to any collaborative process by which a group of designers draft a solution to a design problem, and in a broader sense can be applied to the development of public policy through dialogue between decision-makers and stakeholders.

In a design setting, whilst the structure of a charrette depends on the problem and individuals in the group, charrettes often take place in multiple sessions in which the group divides into sub-groups. Each sub-group then presents its work to the full group as material for further dialogue. Such charrettes serve as a way of quickly generating a design solution while integrating the aptitudes and interests of a diverse group of people. The general idea of a charrette is to create an innovative atmosphere in which a diverse group of stakeholders can collaborate to "generate visions for the future".

The term was introduced to many in the Northeast US by a popular art and architecture supply store chain Charrette (1969–2009).

== Origin ==
The word charrette is French for 'cart' or 'chariot'. Its use in the sense of design and planning arose in the 19th century at the École des Beaux-Arts in Paris, where it was not unusual at the end of a term for teams of student architects to work right up until a deadline, when a charrette would be wheeled among them to collect up their scale models and other work for review. The furious continuation of their work to apply the finishing touches came to be referred to as working en charrette 'in the cart'. Émile Zola depicted such a scene of feverish activity, a nuit de charrette 'charrette night', in L'Œuvre (serialized 1885, published 1886), his fictionalized account of his friendship with Paul Cézanne. The term evolved into the current design-related usage in conjunction with working right up until a deadline.

=== Term ambiguity ===
The word charrette is commonly used to refer to any collaborative process by which a group of designers drafts a solution to a design problem, and in a broader sense, can be applied to the development of public policy through dialogue between decision-makers and stakeholders. In a design setting, whilst the structure of a charrette depends on the problem and individuals in the group, charrettes often take place in multiple sessions in which the group divides into sub-groups. Each sub-group then presents its work to the full group as material for further dialogue. Such charrettes serve as a way of quickly generating a design solution while integrating the aptitudes and interests of a diverse group of people. The general idea of a charrette is to create an innovative atmosphere in which a diverse group of stakeholders can collaborate to "generate visions for the future".

== National Charrette Institute ==
The National Charrette Institute (NCI), the premier charrette training organization in the United States, defines a charrette as a collaborative design process that involves all necessary disciplines at key decision points to produce a feasible plan. A typical charrette lasts at least three to four consecutive days, but could be as long as seven days, and includes three feedback loops. It is an open process that engages all interested parties, including context experts, content experts, and decision-makers. Additionally, the charrette is phase two of the three-phase NCI Charrette System. An NCI charrette is not a one-day workshop, a multiday marathon meeting involving everyone all the time, a plan authored by a select few that will affect many, or a "brainstorming session" that produces a plan but stops short of detailed feasibility testing. The National Charrette Institute (NCI), a unit within the School of Planning, Design, and Construction at Michigan State University, is dedicated to transforming the way people work together by building capacity for collaboration. The NCI is the only entity that trains and supports professionals and community leaders in the NCI Charrette System—an accelerated, collaborative, design-based process that harnesses the talents and energies of all interested stakeholders to create and support a feasible plan. Through research and publication, NCI continues to bring innovation to the process of transformative collaboration. Collaborative decision-making that is based on shared values produces holistic solutions. The work of the National Charrette Institute is grounded in four fundamental values:

- A holistic solution requires a holistic process in which all viewpoints are represented.
- Openness about assumptions, process, and data builds trust and engagement in the process.
- When all relevant stakeholders are present at key decision points, shared learning leads to new understanding and to changes in people's perceptions and positions.
- Designing a shared solution in detail is the best tool for resolving conflict and achieving a shared vision.

The NCI's primary focus is on educating others to bring transformative collaboration to any strategic design effort.

The NCI Certificate Program provides both individuals and organizations with a path toward confidence in preparing for, participating in, or leading charrettes, and ensuring successful implementation and follow-through.

=== NCI Charrette System ===
The NCI Charrette System is a three-phase, holistic, collaborative planning process during which a multiple-day charrette is held as the central transformative event. The NCI Charrette System is designed to assure project success through careful charrette preparation and follow-up.

==== Phase One: Research, engagement, charrette preparation ====
Phase one of the NCI Charrette System focuses on establishing the foundational infrastructure necessary for a successful charrette by building both the information and people components. The information infrastructure involves identifying, creating, and collecting all base data needed for effective planning and design during the charrette. Simultaneously, the people infrastructure requires identifying and engaging all stakeholders essential to achieving a feasible and widely supported outcome, including the project sponsor, project management team, directly affected community members, key decision-makers, and potential supporters or blockers. Early and ongoing collaboration with these groups is critical, as their long-term support depends on being treated with respect and knowing their input will influence the final outcome. The objective of this phase is to become "charrette ready"—a state in which all necessary information, stakeholder engagement, and logistical preparations are in place. Depending on the complexity of the project, this preparation can take anywhere from six weeks to nine months.

==== Phase Two: The charrette ====
Phase Two of the NCI Charrette System centers on the charrette itself—the catalytic, collaborative workshop that typically lasts four to seven days or more and serves as the heart of the planning process. Its primary goal is to develop a feasible plan that gains broad stakeholder support for adoption and implementation. A multidisciplinary charrette team, usually composed of consultants and sponsor staff, leads the process from a studio located on or near the project site. The charrette begins with a public meeting to gather stakeholder values, visions, and needs, after which the team creates and tests alternative plans, refining them toward a preferred solution. The process is structured around three iterative feedback loops that include primary stakeholder meetings, multiple public sessions, and potentially an open house. These loops are essential for integrating stakeholder input at critical decision points and ensuring the feasibility of the evolving plan. Just as importantly, they empower stakeholders to become coauthors of the plan, increasing the likelihood of its long-term success. For even the simplest projects, a minimum of four days is required to complete these loops effectively, while more complex efforts may demand six to seven days or longer. In cases where continuous multi-day sessions are not feasible, some firms adapt by splitting the charrette into multiple three-day events spaced about a month apart.

==== Phase Three: Plan adoption ====
Phase Three of the NCI Charrette System focuses on plan adoption and includes two critical post-charrette processes: product refinement and relationship maintenance. During product refinement, the charrette team further tests and fine-tunes the final plan to ensure its feasibility and alignment with stakeholder input. Concurrently, the project sponsor implements a relationship strategy to sustain stakeholder engagement and support. This continued collaboration is vital to building momentum for the plan's formal adoption and implementation. The process culminates in a post-charrette public meeting—typically held within four to six weeks of the charrette—where the revised plan is presented for final public review and input, reinforcing transparency and stakeholder ownership.

== Examples ==
Charrettes take place in many disciplines, including land-use planning and urban planning. In planning, the charrette has become a technique for consulting with all stakeholders. This type of charrette (sometimes called an enquiry by design) typically involves intense and possibly multi-day meetings, involving municipal officials, developers, and residents. A successful charrette promotes joint ownership of solutions and attempts to defuse typical confrontational attitudes between residents and developers. Charrettes tend to involve small groups, however, the residents participating may not represent all the residents nor have the moral authority to represent them. Residents who do participate get early input into the planning process.

=== Midland, Australia (1997) ===
The Midland Revitalization Charrette in Perth, Australia, addressed the economic and social decline following the closure of the Midland Railway Workshops. Conducted over five days in September 1997, the charrette engaged a wide range of community members—including young people, local businesses, government agencies, and the Aboriginal community—to co-develop a vision for Midland's future. Participants met at three local venues to discuss concerns, design opportunities, and collaboratively envision plans for economic renewal, infill development, and river rehabilitation. The resulting proposals focused on mixed-use development, enhanced connectivity, and cultural heritage preservation. The charrette fostered long-term partnerships, community ownership, and the establishment of initiatives like the Woodbridge Lakes neighborhood and the Midland Workshops Heritage Open Day, leading to sustained regeneration and civic pride.

=== East Nashville, Tennessee, US (1999) ===
In response to a devastating tornado in 1998, the East Nashville R/UDAT Charrette was held in July 1999 to guide the neighborhood's recovery and revitalization. Led by a multidisciplinary team and supported by the American Institute of Architects, the charrette included over 1,000 participants and emphasized community participation through open mic sessions, workshops, and public design events. The community focused on restoring services, developing greenways and parks, reducing crime, and promoting local identity. The effort culminated in a bold vision for mixed-use redevelopment and the formation of 'Rediscover East', a lasting grassroots initiative. In 2012, a follow-up charrette led to plans for over 2,300 new homes and 20,000 m^{2} of community and commercial space, underscoring how a design-led recovery process can transform a vulnerable neighborhood into a thriving, self-sustaining community.

=== Scarborough, England (2002) ===
The Scarborough Renaissance Charrette marked a turning point for the declining seaside town in North Yorkshire. Held in April 2002 as a five-day Community Planning Weekend, the charrette engaged more than 1,000 residents, youth, business leaders, and local officials to reimagine Scarborough's identity and economy. Through open workshops and walking audits, participants articulated a vision of the town as a multifaceted place—simultaneously a heritage, health, cultural, and investment destination. A new "Town Team" and associated Action Teams were established to guide implementation, resulting in the Scarborough Renaissance Charter. The outcomes included major public realm improvements, creation of jobs and enterprises, cultural infrastructure like the Open Air Theatre, and the development of a University Technical College. The project earned multiple awards and became a nationally recognized model of community-driven urban transformation.

== In U.S. social history ==
As dramatized for the film The Best of Enemies (2019), in 1971, a charrette was used to address inter-racial tensions in order to facilitate school desegregation in the city of Durham, North Carolina.

== See also ==
- Barn raising
- Shturmovshchina
- Talkoot
- Writing circle
