= Brian Metcalf =

American film director

Brian A. Metcalf
- Born: Seoul, South Korea
- Occupations: Film director; screenwriter; producer; editor; showrunner; actor
- Website: www.bametcalf.com

Brian A. Metcalf is an American writer, director, producer, showrunner, model and actor. He wrote, directed and produced the Lionsgate crime thriller film Adverse and the Amazon Freevee mockumentary comedy series Underdeveloped.

== Film Career ==
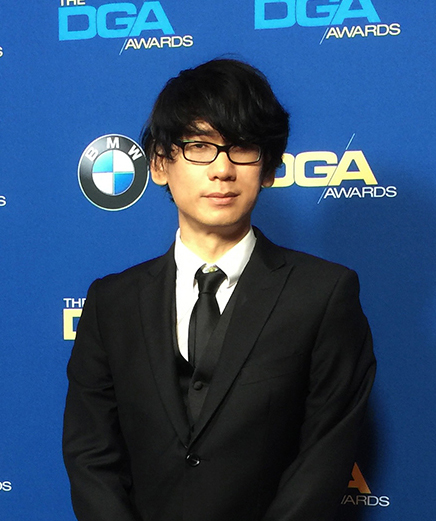
Metcalf at the DGA Awards

Metcalf directed the micro-budgeted drama/thriller The Lost Tree. The premiere was held at the TCL Chinese Theatre before a limited theatrical release in 2012.

Metcalf wrote, directed and produced Living Among Us which stars John Heard (in his final performance), William Sadler, James Russo, Esme Bianco, Andrew Keegan and Thomas Ian Nicholas. The film was distributed by Sony Pictures Home Entertainment and given a limited theatrical release in 2017.

Metcalf designed the poster for the Syrian documentary Little Gandhi, and won the Murray Weissman Award for it.

Metcalf created and directed the drama/thriller film Adverse, with a cast including Mickey Rourke, Lou Diamond Phillips, Sean Astin, Penelope Ann Miller, Matt Ryan, Jake T. Austin, Thomas Ian Nicholas, Andrew Keegan and Shelley Regner.

The film carries a 75% rating at Rotten Tomatoes.

Adverse premiered at Fantasporto Film Festival in Portugal. Metcalf won a Platinum Remi Award for directing Adverse at the 2020 WorldFest-Houston International Film Festival. He also won an Award of Excellence Special Mention from IndieFEST for his work on Adverse. Both Deadline Hollywood and Variety announced that Lionsgate's Grindstone Entertainment would be distributing the film. It opened in theaters on February 12, 2021.

After working together on Adverse, Variety announced a new collaboration between Rourke and Metcalf titled Twilight Into Darkness in which both of them would produce and Metcalf would direct.

On December 13, 2022, Variety announced that Metcalf would be writing, producing, directing and showrunning a new limited series called Underdeveloped starring Thomas Ian Nicholas, Tom Arnold, Mark Pellegrino, Samm Levine, Shelley Regner, Kelly Arjen, Charlene Amoia, Nolan River and Jaret Reddick. The “UnderDeveloped” show premiered at TubiTV on September 8, 2023.

On May 29, 2024, “Deadline” announced that Metcalf was showrunning a new dramedy series with actor Mark Pellegrino. That series was changed into the film 'A Crime Story'

== Modeling ==
Metcalf began modeling during the 2023 Hollywood labor disputes after being invited to walk in a runway presentation. He has since walked and modeled in New York, Los Angeles, Paris and London. He opened for designer Monday Blues at the Council of Fashion Designers of America calendar show, Break Free, and appeared on the cover of Grazia Men Slovenia in February 2026. Metcalf has done shoots with designer Tombogo for Harper’s Bazaar, with Men's Day designer, Christopher Lowman, and Elle on an editorial marking Lowman's return to the Official New York Fashion Week Calendar in September. and a collaborative shoot between Porsche, Elle and Harper’s Bazaar where he wore clothes from Council of Fashion Designers of America/Vogue fund finalist designer, "No Sesso". He has appeared in Vogue, Harper’s Bazaar, Glamour, Grazia and Elle.

In September 2026, Harper’s Bazaar covered an additional series of editorial shoots featuring Metcalf alongside designers such as CFDA legacy jewelry designer Erickson Beamon in collaboration with New York Men's day designer WÀNGDA and model Anna Alimani, Project Runway (Season 22) finalist Bi Pham, New York Men's Day designers Terry Singh and Christopher Lowman, French Luxury designer Valerian Hughes Paris and Tombogo in collaboration with G-Star The WÀNGDA, Erickson Beamon, and Christopher Lowman features were additionally published in Elle

== Filmography ==
Film & TV
Year	Film & TV	Credits	Acting role
2006	The Egyptian Book of the Dead	Producer, visual effects	
2008	Fading of the Cries	Writer (original story), producer	
2012	The Lost Tree	Writer, director, producer, actor	Pedestrian
2018	Living Among Us	Writer, director, producer, actor	Paul
2021	Adverse	Writer, director, producer, actor	Dante
2023	Underdeveloped	Showrunner, writer, director, executive producer, actor	Stan
2026	A Crime Story	Writer, director, producer, actor	Ahn
