= Oaxaca FilmFest =

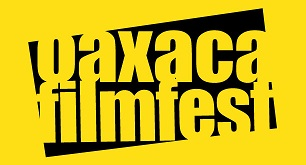
- Location: Oaxaca, Mexico
- Founded: 2010
- Language: Spanish (Mainly); English (Mainly)
- Website: www.oaxacafilmfest.net

Oaxaca FilmFest was an eight-day long international film festival that was permanently cancelled in 2022. At its start, the festival was held every autumn in the Mexican city of Oaxaca from 2010 - 2019, and again from 2021. The festival is composed of various categories and offered a large space in its selection to emerging directors and screenwriters.

== History ==
The festival was founded by Ramiz Adeeb Azar, with the first edition of the festival held in November 2010. MovieMaker magazine listed it as one of "50 Film Festivals Worth the Entry Fee" three times. Oaxaca FilmFest has included the works of artist such as Guillermo del Toro, Robert De Niro, Clint Eastwood, Spike Lee, Neil LaBute, Diego Luna, Takashi Miike, Martin Scorsese, Bill Plympton, Donald Sutherland, Luke Wilson, and Brian A. Metcalf.

== Decline ==
Starting in 2019, the festival began accepting a large number of submissions. Complaints began to emerge from filmmakers who had attended the festival about mandatory payment requirements, poor screening conditions and a lack of curation. There were also doubts raised about the festival’s professed relationship with HBO and UTA.

== Awards ==
=== Award Winners for Best Global Feature ===
Year	Film	Director	Country
2010	La Soga	Josh Crook	Dominican Republic
2011	Crebisnky	Enrique Otero	Spain
2012	Kurtuluş Son Durak	Yusuf Pirhasan	Turkey
2013	Tu seras un homme	Benoit Cohen	France
2014	Daire	Atıl İnaç	Turkey
2015	The Wannabe	Nick Sandow	United States
2016	Suntan	Argyris Papadimitropoulos	Greece
2017	Badsville	April Mullen	United States
2018	Here We Are	David Bellarosa	United States
2019	Time Out	Matti Kinnunen	Finland
2020 NOT HELD
2021	Adverse	Brian A. Metcalf	United States
