= The Lost Tree =

2016 horror film

- Official poster
- Directed by: Brian A. Metcalf
- Written by: Brian A. Metcalf
- Produced by: Brian A. Metcalf; Thomas Ian Nicholas
- Starring: Thomas Ian Nicholas; Lacey Chabert; Scott Grimes; Clare Kramer; Michael Madsen
- Cinematography: Brian A. Metcalf; Evan Okada
- Music by: Nathaniel Levisay
- Production companies: Red Compass Media; Shoreline Entertainment
- Distributed by: MTI Home Video
- Release dates: March 18, 2016 (NHCF); January 23, 2018 (DVD)
- Running time: 88 minutes
- Country: America
- Language: English

The Lost Tree is a 2016 American supernatural horror film directed and written by Brian A. Metcalf and starring Thomas Ian Nicholas, Lacey Chabert, Scott Grimes, Clare Kramer and Michael Madsen. The film follows Noah Ericson (Nicholas), a newly widowed office worker who moves to an isolated cabin and starts noticing strange occurrences, the source of which is a tree.

== Premise ==
Guilt-ridden over the death of his wife Emma, office worker Noah Ericson moves from the city to a cabin in an isolated area. Upon arriving, he starts to experience supernatural occurrences, including messages from his deceased wife. He soon discovers that the source is an old tree.

== Cast ==
- Thomas Ian Nicholas as Noah Ericson
- Lacey Chabert as Jenna Lynds
- Michael Madsen as John Ericson
- Scott Grimes as Alan Parks
- Clare Kramer as Emma
- Anna Sophia Berglund as Claudia Tambors
- Brian A. Metcalf as a pedestrian

== Production ==
In August 2012, Thomas Ian Nicholas was cast in The Lost Tree. In October 2012, Nicholas and Brian Metcalf announced that the film was in pre-production, with Metcalf serving as director and writer and Nicholas serving as producer. The castings of Lacey Chabert, Michael Madsen, Scott Grimes, and Clare Kramer were also announced. Principal photography took place during November 2012 in Los Angeles.

== Release ==
On February 5, 2013, a teaser trailer and poster for The Lost Tree was released.

The Lost Tree premiered at the NoHo Cinefest in North Hollywood, Los Angeles on March 18, 2016. The film was released direct-to-video by MTI Home Video on January 23, 2018.
