= Living Among Us =

2018 film directed by Brian Metcalf

- Theatrical release poster
- Directed by: Brian Metcalf
- Written by: Brian A. Metcalf
- Produced by: Brian A. Metcalf, Thomas Ian Nicholas, Ben Chan
- Starring: William Sadler; Thomas Ian Nicholas; James Russo; Esmé Bianco; Andrew Keegan; John Heard
- Cinematography: Brian A. Metcalf
- Edited by: Brian A. Metcalf
- Distributed by: Vision Films, Sony Pictures Home Entertainment
- Release date: 2 February 2018
- Running time: 88 minutes
- Country: United States
- Language: English

Living Among Us is a 2018 American vampire horror film, overseen by Brian Metcalf. Filmed in 2013, it was released in 2018, 7 months after the death of John Heard (who played as Andrew), making it his last feature film release.

The film was distributed by Vision Films and Sony Pictures Home Entertainment, with a limited theatrical release. On January 31, 2018, the Academy of Motion Picture Arts and Sciences requested that writer/director/producer Brian Metcalf allow the script, marking Heard's last work, to be added to their Permanent Core Collection inside the Margaret Herrick Library.

== Summary ==
In the wake of an exposé revealing that supposed vampires have been subsisting on supplies from blood donation facilities, vampire sectional leader Samuel endeavors to publicly spread a message that vampires are not murderous and wish to coexist with humans. Through an arrangement with Samuel, KMNBR TV station manager Aaron Stafford assigns his eager brother-in-law Benny to team with accomplished documentarian Mike and Mike’s girlfriend Carrie for a vampire family interview.

Mike, Benny, and Carrie arrive at a house and meet vampire Andrew Pritchard, his wife Elleanor Grey, and their “sons” Blake and Selvin. Andrew instructs the crew that they cannot enter the basement, they cannot film vampire rituals, and they are not to disturb the family while they sleep during daytime.

Anxious to portray vampires as pacifists, Andrew dispels common beliefs about vampires as myths while explaining their physiology in medical terms. Elleanor claims that Andrew saved her from a fatal illness by turning her into a vampire.

Rebellious and narcissistic, Blake recounts how Andrew made him a vengeful vampire following his troubled youth. Andrew’s presence during his interview causes Blake to hold back on enthusiastically discussing killing humans.

Selvin’s odd behavior disturbs Mike, Benny, and Carrie. Blake explains that Selvin nearly went mad and became partly feral after being imprisoned in darkness for 30 years.

While the crew sleeps that night, Selvin sneaks into their bedroom and sniffs Carrie. The next day, Mike plants hidden cameras throughout the house before having a videoconference with Aaron. Blake demonstrates how sunlight burns his arm.

Carrie gets a nosebleed at breakfast. After spending the afternoon sleeping, Carrie becomes cold and pale, forcing her to remain in bed.

Samuel arrives at the house that evening with two blonde women that he introduces as his daughters Rebecca and Sybil. With Mike and Benny secretly recording via hidden cameras, the vampires allow Mike and Benny to witness the sacrifice of a prostitute as they drink her blood.

Mike and Benny spy Samuel’s daughters making out in the pool. Intending for Mike and Benny to document the slaughter without Andrew’s knowledge, Blake and Selvin take Mike and Benny to a house where they behead, slash, and dismember three stoners.

Back at the family’s house, Mike and Benny discover surveillance footage indicating a possible romantic link between Samuel and Elleanor. Mike and Benny come to suspect they are being targeted for death when additional footage shows Andrew berating Blake for allowing them to witness more murders.

After an uncomfortable conversation with Andrew and Elleanor, Mike and Benny arm themselves with weapons for combating vampires. They then collect Carrie, who is severely weakened with bloody wounds all over her back. While trying to fight their way out of the house, Mike and Benny seemingly kill Blake with holy water and a silver knife.

Mike and Benny flee with Carrie through basement catacombs lined with corpses. Benny notices a royal painting of Elleanor, indicating that she may actually be an ancient vampire elder.

A horde of dweller vampires attacks Carrie. Realizing that she is turning undead anyway, Carrie sacrifices herself by running off alone to create a distraction for Mike and Benny.

Selvin attacks. Mike shoots Selvin dead with silver bullets.

Back upstairs in the house, Mike and Benny confront Andrew and Elleanor. Following a fight, Benny ends up holding Elleanor at knifepoint while Andrew holds Mike. Acting on his suspicion that she is an elder, Benny slits Elleanor’s throat, which harms Andrew in turn. Mike pulls back a curtain. Sunlight combusts both Andrew and Elleanor.

Mike and Benny escape to their car outside. However, Blake reappears in the backseat and murders them both.

Samuel appears on a newscast to dispute allegations that murderous vampires were involved in the documentary team’s disappearance. Aaron ambushes Samuel with the secretly shot footage of the murders, publicly proving that Samuel’s claims about vampires are lies..

== Cast ==
- Esmé Bianco as Elleanor
- Thomas Ian Nicholas as Mike
- Andrew Keegan as Blake
- William Sadler as Samuel
- John Heard as Andrew
- Jordan Hinson as Carrie
- James Russo as Aaron
- Jessica Morris as Sybil
- Travis Aaron Wade as Rick
- Chad Todhunter as Selvin
- Hunter Gomez as Benny
- Anna Sophia Berglund as Journey
- Brian Metcalf as Paul
- Chris Kos as News Anchor
- Bobby Block as Dave
- Amanda Rau as Rebecca

== Reviews ==
The film received mixed reviews. On review aggregator website Rotten Tomatoes, the film holds an approval rating of 14%, based on seven reviews. The Los Angeles Times felt that it was a “regrettable” finale to John Heard's career, stating that the only reason to bother watching the film is to see Heard's last work.
