= Bombay Blue =

Bombay Blue may refer to:

- Bombay Blue, a 1997 British television series directed by Roger Tucker
- Bombay Blue, a brand name for a variety of synthetic cannabis
