= Ward Russell =

American cinematographer and photographer

- Education: University of Kansas
- Years active: 1977–2007
- Spouse: Mary Cay Hollander

Ward T. Russell is an American cinematographer and photographer.

== Career ==
He is best known for his collaborations with film director Tony Scott, serving as a chief lighting technician on Top Gun, Beverly Hills Cop II, Revenge, before working as a cinematographer on Days of Thunder and The Last Boy Scout

== Personal life ==
He is married to film production coordinator Mary Cay Hollander.

== Filmography ==
=== Cinematographer ===
Film

| Year | Title | Director |
|---|---|---|
| 1990 | Days of Thunder | Tony Scott |
| 1991 | The Last Boy Scout | Tony Scott |
| 1996 | Lawnmower Man 2: Beyond Cyberspace | Farhad Mann |
| 1998 | The X-Files | Rob Bowman |
| 2004 | Unstoppable | David Carson |
| 2005 | Cruel World | Kelsey T. Howard |

Short film

| Year | Title | Director |
|---|---|---|
| 2007 | The Burden Carriers | Pierre Barrera |

=== Other roles ===
Best boy

- Record City (1977)
- Our Winning Season (1978)
- The Electric Horseman (1979) (uncredited)
- The Idolmaker (1980) (electric best boy)
- Soggy Bottom, U.S.A. (1981)
- Independence Day (1983)

Gaffer

- Dreamscape (1984)
- Frankenweenie (1984)
- Mussolini: The Untold Story (1985)
- Back to School (1986)

Chief lighting technician

- Top Gun (1986)
- Beverly Hills Cop II (1987)
- Revenge (1990)

Other credits

| Year | Title | Role |
|---|---|---|
| 2004 | Elvis Has Left the Building | Camera operator |
| 2006 | Believe in Me | Director of photography: landscape |
| 2007 | Undead or Alive | Director of photography: second unit |
