= Charlene Amoia =

American actress

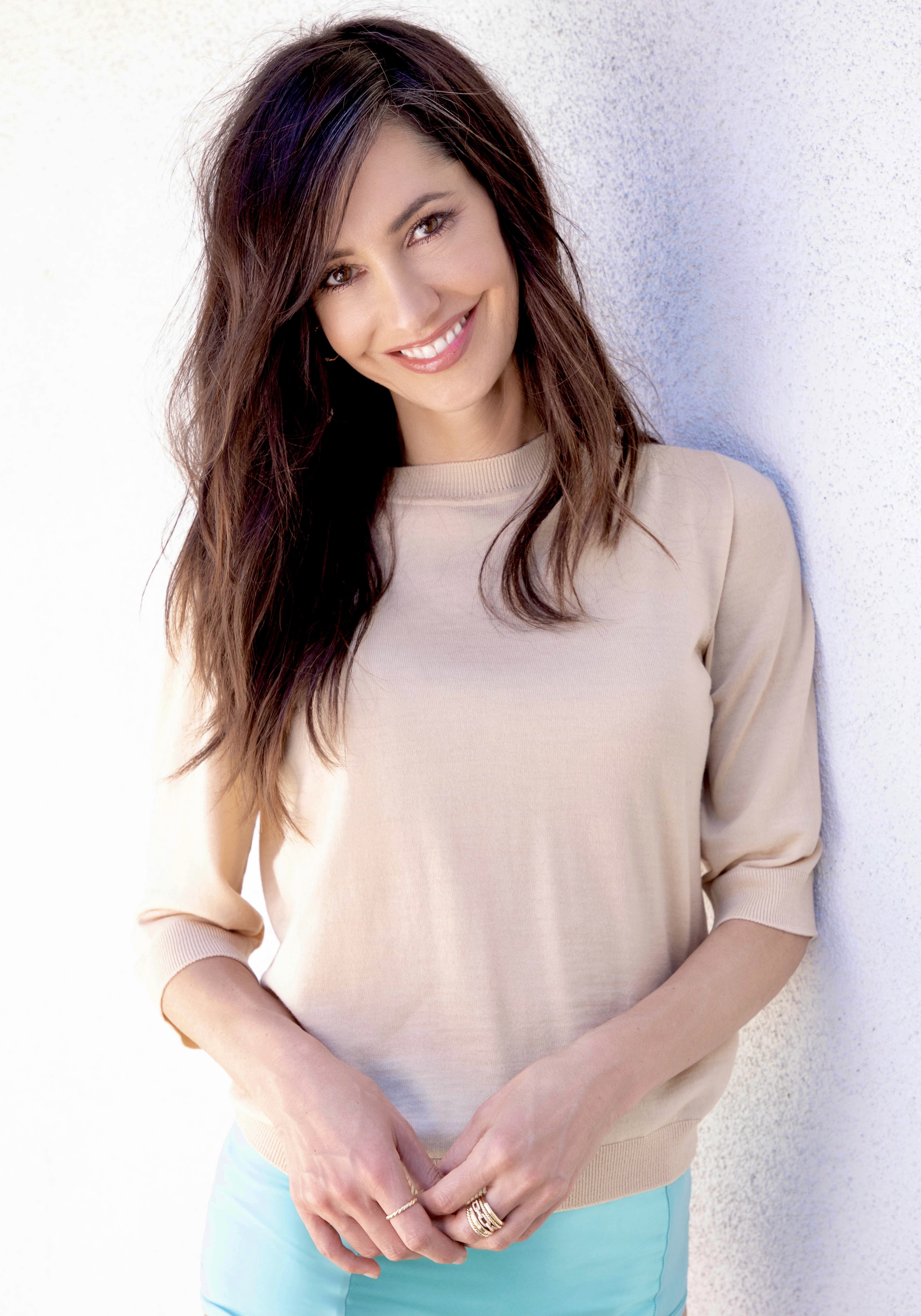
- Born: Buffalo, New York, U.S.
- Occupation: Actress
- Years active: 2001–present

Charlene M. Amoia is an American actress. She is best known for her recurring role as Wendy the Waitress in the sitcom How I Met Your Mother. Her film credits include American Reunion (2012), Authors Anonymous (2014), Sniper: Special Ops (2016), Harley Quinn: Birds of Prey (2020), Fear Street: Part One - 1994 (2021), and The Conjuring: The Devil Made Me Do It (2021).

== Childhood ==
Amoia was born in Buffalo, New York. She was raised in Buffalo and relocated to Las Vegas at the age of 15. She is of Italian and Spanish descent.

== Career ==
She began her career in modeling, before making the transition to acting. She appeared in guest starring roles in numerous television shows, including Joey, The Resident, Shameless, and Man with a Plan.

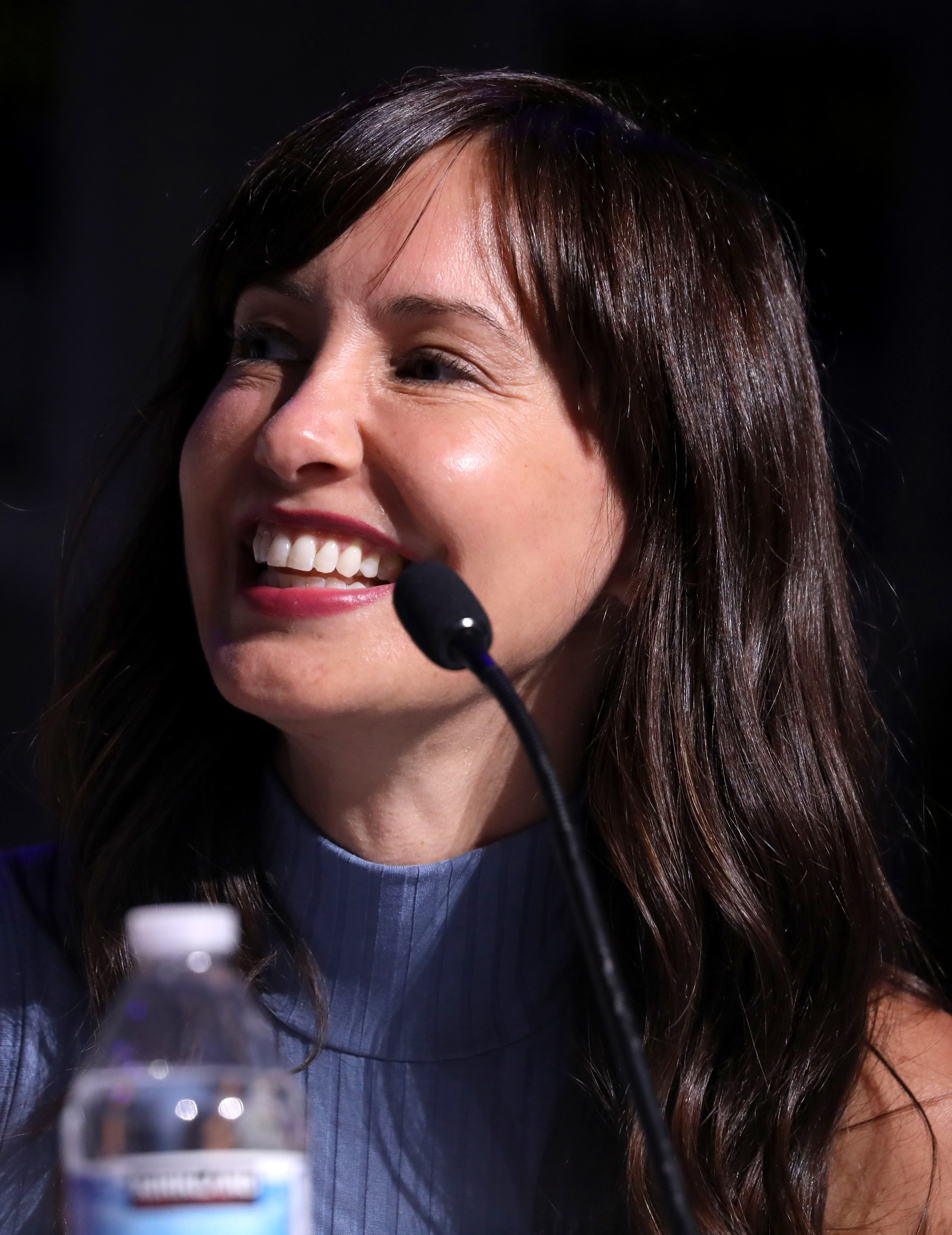
Amoia at the 2023 San Diego Comic-Con

She portrayed waitress Wendy in American sitcom How I Met Your Mother from 2005 to 2011. On playing Wendy, she has said, "I love playing flawed characters. Wendy is so genuinely sweet and guileless to a point that she doesn't realize she's being taken advantage of. Being able to take on these characteristics in a way that is funny and harmless is always so much fun!"

Amoia played Ellie, Kevin (Thomas Ian Nicholas)'s wife, in the fourth American Pie film, released in 2012.

Amoia portrayed Dr. Fraser on House, Bailey on Glee and Diana Cotto on Switched at Birth. In 2008, she portrayed Miss Wells in the teen drama television series 90210. She played Jill in the drama film Fat (2013), which premiered at the Toronto International Film Festival.

She has guest starred on the show NCIS: New Orleans as Carly Dawson in the episode "Breaking Brig" and Kelly Press on an episode of Major Crimes. She played Janet Conrad, a pushy NATO Photographer who was seeking a career changing "Front Line Photo" in the film Sniper: Special Ops (2016). In 2017 she appeared on American Horror Story in the episode "Great Again". In season 14 of Grey's Anatomy she appeared as Dr. Kate Lachman.

== Filmography ==
=== Film ===
| Year | Title | Role | Notes |
|---|---|---|---|
| 2003 | Alabama: American Farewell Tour | Texas Beauty | |
| 2008 | Seven Pounds | Woman in Diner | |
| 2012 | American Reunion | Ellie | |
| 2013 | Fat | Jill | |
| 2014 | Authors Anonymous | Eudora | |
| 2015 | Adrenaline | Josie Rigsby | |
| 2016 | Sniper: Special Ops | Janet | |
| 2018 | Not a Stranger | Carol | |
| 2017 | Deadly Vows | Becca | |
| 2018 | Cold Brook | Miss Simmons | |
| 2020 | Birds of Prey | Maria Bertinelli | |
| 2020 | Adverse | Mary | |
| 2021 | The Conjuring: The Devil Made Me Do It | Judy Glatzel | |
| 2021 | Fear Street Part One: 1994 | Rachel Thompson/Sunnyvale Customer | |
| 2021 | Fear Street Part Three: 1666 | Beth Kimball/Rachel Thompson | |
| 2022 | A Royal Christmas on Ice | Janet | |
| 2025 | Lifeline | Vivian Huxley | |
| 2025 | Descendent | | |

=== Television ===
| Year | Title | Role | Notes |
|---|---|---|---|
| 2001–2003 | Port Charles | Katrina / Marissa Murphy | 5 episodes |
| 2004 | Joey | Diane | Episode: "Joey and the Book Club" |
| 2005–2011 | How I Met Your Mother | Wendy the Waitress | 17 episodes |
| 2006 | Girlfriends | Wife | Episode: "I'll Be There for You... But Not Right Now" |
| 2006 | One on One | Shelley | Episode: "California Girl" |
| 2006 | Mind of Mencia | Miss Spring Break / Jen | 3 episodes |
| 2006 | My Boys | Corinne | Episode: "Clubhouse Poison" |
| 2007 | Dexter | Young Woman | Episode: "The Dark Defender" |
| 2007 | Nip/Tuck | Sandy | Episode: "Carly Summers" |
| 2007 | Company Man | Stacey Lee | Television film |
| 2007–2008 | The Young and the Restless | Anna Schick | 5 episodes |
| 2008 | 90210 | Miss Wells | Episode: "Hollywood Forever" |
| 2009 | Trust Me | Heather Liston | Episode: "Before and After" |
| 2009 | Criminal Minds | Nancy | Episode: "House on Fire" |
| 2010 | Castle | Ana Marie | Episode: "A Deadly Affair" |
| 2010 | House | Dr. Fraser | Episode: "Unplanned Parenthood" |
| 2010–2011 | Days of Our Lives | Nurse Katie | 4 episodes |
| 2011 | Glee | Bailey | Episode: "Comeback" |
| 2011 | Shameless | Audrey | Episode: "Daddyz Girl" |
| 2011 | Mad Love | Heather | Episode: "The Secret Life of Larry" |
| 2011 | NCIS: Los Angeles | Michelle Ardell | Episode: "Imposters" |
| 2011 | iCarly | Jenna Hamilton | Episode: "iLove You" |
| 2011 | The Christmas Pageant | Margaret | Hallmark Channel TV Movie |
| 2012 | The Finder | Annie Turnbull | Episode: "The Last Meal" |
| 2012 | The Mentalist | Melaina Mendelssohn | Episode: "Devil's Cherry" |
| 2013 | Switched at Birth | Diana Coto | Episodes: "He Did What He Wanted", "What Goes Up Must Come Down" |
| 2013 | Drop Dead Diva | Lonna Wycott | Episode: "Guess Who's Coming" |
| 2014 | The Soul Man | Ariana | Episode: "Moving on Up" |
| 2014 | NCIS: New Orleans | Carly Dawson | Episode: "Breaking Brig" |
| 2014 | Bones | Annie Wachlin | Episode: "The Money Maker on the Merry-Go-Round" |
| 2014 | HR | Dana Arty | Television film |
| 2015 | Major Crimes | Kelly Press | Episode: "Personal Effects" |
| 2015 | Sleepy Hollow | Susan James | Episode: "Whispers in the Dark" |
| 2017 | General Hospital | Rose Caldwell | Episodes: "Episode #1.13916", "Episode #1.13917" |
| 2017 | Deadly Vows | Becca Dillon | Television film |
| 2017 | American Horror Story | Woman | Episode: "Great Again" |
| 2017 | Behind Enemy Lines | Christine Nelson | Television film |
| 2018 | NCIS | Denise Mancuso | Episode: "High Tide" |
| 2018 | 9-1-1 | Dolores Graham | Episode: "Stuck" |
| 2018 | The Guest Book | Debbie | Episode: "Two Steps Forward, One Step Back" |
| 2018 | Grey's Anatomy | Dr. Kate Lachman | Episode: "Games People Play" |
| 2019 | Good Trouble | Heather | Episode: "Episode #2.5" |
| 2019 | The Flash | Miss Pellett | Episode: "The Flash & the Furious" |
| 2019 | The Resident | Bobbi Hendricks | Episode: "If Not Now, When?" |
| 2019 | Bigger | Lori | 2 episodes |
| 2020 | Man with a Plan | Bessica | Episode: "Adam and Andi See Other People" |
| 2021 | Shameless Hall of Shame | Audrey | Episode: "Debbie, Carl & Liam: They Grow Up So Fast" |
| 2021 | Just Beyond | Principal Grace | Episode: "Leave Them Kids Alone" |
| 2022 | Sons of Thunder | Sandy | 6 episodes |
| 2023 | Underdeveloped | Pam Chowder | 3 episodes |
| 2024 | St. Denis Medical | El | Episode: "1.10" |
| 2025 | Cobra Kai | Julia | Episode: "6.15" |
