= Sniper Special Ops =

2016 film by Fred Olen Ray

- Official DVD cover
- Directed by: Fred Olen Ray
- Written by: Fred Olen Ray; Sebastian Bell
- Produced by: Barry Barnholtz; Fred Olen Ray; Jeffrey Schenck
- Starring: Steven Seagal; Rob Van Dam; Tim Abell
- Cinematography: Stuart Brereton
- Edited by: Ryan Mitchelle
- Music by: Nick Soole; David Buckley
- Production companies: Steamroller Productions; Hybrid; Voltage Pictures
- Distributed by: Lionsgate Home Entertainment
- Release date: May 3, 2016
- Running time: 84 minutes
- Country: United States
- Language: English

Sniper Special Ops is a 2016 American war action drama film written and directed by Fred Olen Ray and starring Steven Seagal, who also serves as executive producer for the film. It is unrelated to the long-running Sniper film series.

== Plot ==
Sergeant Jake Chandler, an expert sniper, joins Sergeant Vic Mosby with the Delta Force during an overwatch mission to extract an American Congressman who is being held by the Taliban in a remote Afghan village. At first, the rescue mission is successful until a firefight breaks out. Evac is called in but Chandler and his spotter Pvt. Rich are separated from the squad. During the extraction, several members of the squad are killed or wounded, forcing them to leave without Chandler and Rich.

Upon returning the base, Mosby tries to convince Lieutenant Colonel Jackson to let him go back for his fellow soldiers, but is instead ordered to retrieve munitions which could be vital for the base. Accompanied by Vasquez and Jennings, Mosby rendezvouses with Spc. Tyler at his broken down munitions truck. The squad is also accompanied by Janet, a NATO photographer. In addition to the munitions, Tyler also has a woman and child, who are revealed to be the last surviving members of the local Taliban leader's family. They are attacked by local militants, resulting in Tyler's death and Jennings and Janet being wounded.

Mosby orders Jennings back to the camp with Janet and the supplies while he and Vasquez return the woman, her name being revealed to be Jada, and her child to the Taliban in exchange for the safe extraction of Chandler and Rich. During this, Rich has developed a fever and his slowly dying, causing Chandler to call in a risky evacuation. Upon arriving in the city, Mosby and Vasquez seemingly hand over the woman but she is revealed to be Janet in disguise. Janet attaches explosives to the Taliban leader and he is killed in the resulting explosion.

After the fight between the squad and Taliban ends, Chandler and Rich are rescued by Mosby, Vasquez and Janet.

== Cast ==
- Steven Seagal as Sergeant Jacob Chandler
- Tim Abell as Sergeant Victor Mosby
- Rob Van Dam as Specialist Vasquez
- Dale Dye as Lieutenant Colonel Jackson
- Charlene Amoia as Janet
- Jason-Shane Scott as Specialist Tyler
- Daniel Booko as Private Rich
- Anthony Batarse as Bashir
- Gerald Webb as Private Marcus

== Reception ==
Looper stated ’’The premise doesn't sound too bad, but there's ultimately little to enjoy in this mindless, paint-by-numbers shoot 'em up." Other reviews were also quite negative.
