= Love, Wedding, Marriage =

- Theatrical release poster
- Directed by: Dermot Mulroney
- Written by: Anouska Chydzik; Caprice Crane
- Produced by: Michelle Chydzik Sowa
- Starring: Mandy Moore; Kellan Lutz; James Brolin; Jane Seymour; Christopher Lloyd
- Cinematography: Óttar Guðnason
- Edited by: Heather Persons
- Music by: Blake Neely
- Production companies: Chydzik Media Group; Voodoo Production Services; First Wedding Productions
- Distributed by: IFC Films
- Release date: June 3, 2011 (U.S.)
- Running time: 90 minutes
- Country: United States
- Language: English
- Budget: $13 million
- Box office: $515,823

Love, Wedding, Marriage is a 2011 American romantic comedy film directed by Dermot Mulroney in his feature film directorial debut. It stars Mandy Moore, Kellan Lutz, James Brolin, Jane Seymour and Christopher Lloyd. It was released on June 3, 2011.

== Plot ==
Ava and Charlie are newlyweds that have been inspired by her parents', Bradley and Betty's 30-year marriage. Ava decides to throw them a surprise anniversary party, but when Betty finds out about an affair Bradley had 25 years ago, she refuses to live with him. Ava then moves her father into her house, without consulting Charlie.

Ava promises her new husband that it will only be for a short while. Being a marriage counselor, she obsesses over fixing her parents' marriage so much that it starts to affect their relationship. They stop having sex and then, their friend Gerber and new Polish wife, Kasia, whom he had met the night before, show up. He mentions Charlie's first marriage 10 years ago, that she never knew about. Ava gets upset and Charlie tries to explain that it was a long time ago and he was drunk when it happened.

When Ava decides to send her parents to another therapist, he suggests doing a rock climbing exercise to help build trust. One partner climbs while the other holds the rope for support. During the exercise, Ava's parents get into an argument and her father leaves the rope and Betty suspended in air calling for help. Ava leaves her own rope with Charlie to help her mother, which results in him falling and injuring his back and neck. When she tries to apologize, Charlie warns her that her distracted behavior is causing an increasing gulf between them.

Ava is still planning the anniversary party in secret when her mother tells her she's leaving on a 6-month-trip to Asia in 10 days. Her new plan to bring her parents together enlists Charlie's help to take her father out for a guys night. They meet up with Gerber at a bar, the trio winds up at a strip club and they become incredibly intoxicated. Arriving home, they find Ava with her mother and Bradley tells Betty she can leave as he's going to marry a hot, young girl from Europe, an idea he got from Gerber. Ava scolds Charlie for ruining her plan which then leads to him complaining about their sex life.

When Ava's sister Shelby takes Betty speed dating, Bradley is at home with Ava, takes a few sleeping pills and falls asleep. Ava flushes the rest of the pills down the toilet and calls 9-1-1 to make it look like a suicide attempt. During that time, Betty realizes that no man could ever replace Bradley and even more so when she finds out that he's in the hospital.

When Charlie asks Ava how many pills Bradley had taken, she admits that she had created the whole incident attempting to bring her parents together. He yells at her for her manipulative behavior, storming out of the hospital. When Ava gets home, she discovers that Charlie has left to stay at Gerber's.

The next day, Ava goes to Charlie's office to apologize, and asks him to return home. He replies that “he can't answer that right now”. Inviting him to her parents' 30th anniversary party which is now back on, he declines, saying that he isn't in the mood for celebrating. Ava becomes enraged and accuses Charlie of having an affair with his secretary, Adriana. He denies it, questions her motives for marrying him and suggests that perhaps she did it to boost her career and lend credibility to her marriage counseling business. Ava is stunned, and leaves.

The next day, Gerber kicks Charlie out as Kasia's family comes to visit. When Charlie hears Gerber talk to his wife in Polish, and asks him about it, Gerber says that if you love someone and want to live a successful married life, you have to accept and respect their family as well. Charlie goes to find Ava who is at her parents' party. They meet after Ava realizes it's her own fault for the way their marriage is and wants to apologize. Charlie redoes his marriage vows and Ava responds, "I do." Charlie suggests going back to the party, but Ava suggests they consummate their marriage instead.

== Cast ==
- Mandy Moore as Ava Gold
- Kellan Lutz as Charlie
- Jane Seymour as Betty Gold
- James Brolin as Bradley Gold
- Jessica Szohr as Shelby Gold
- Michael Weston as Gerber
- Marta Żmuda Trzebiatowska as Kasia
- Richard Reid as Ian
- Christopher Lloyd as Dr. George
- Alexis Denisof as Lloyd
- Alyson Hannigan as Courtney
- Colleen Camp as Ethel
- Andrew Keegan as Jeremiah Stevens
- Gabrielle Shuff as Adrianna
- Joe Chrest as John
- Kim Vu as Amy
- Autumn Federici as Jessica
- Sarah Lieving as Rachel
- Billy Slaughter as Actor (voice)
- Julia Roberts as Ava's Therapist (voice)

== Reception ==
The film was panned by film critics. On review aggregation website Rotten Tomatoes, it has a 0% approval rating, based on 19 reviews with a weighted average score of 2/10. On Metacritic, it scored 13 out of 100, an "overwhelming dislike" based on reviews from ten critics. The Los Angeles Times called it "an emotional wreck of major proportions". Slant Magazine said it was "wooden and shallow". The Hollywood Reporter called it "a flat romantic comedy" [...] "that would have seemed insipid even in 1953". They added that Moore came across as a "high school student" and that "Lutz's dyed blond hair does nothing to encourage taking him seriously." The Village Voice said it was full of "half-hearted melodramatics and schmaltzy bromides". The New York Times said Lutz looks like a "Ken-doll husband," suggesting "more success in bench-pressing than grape-crushing." They added the film felt like "punishment for a crime you can’t remember committing".
