= A Kid in King Arthur's Court =

1995 film by Michael Gottlieb

- Theatrical release poster
- Directed by: Michael Gottlieb
- Written by: Michael Part; Robert L. Levy
- Produced by: Peter Abrams; J.P. Guerin; Robert L. Levy
- Starring: Thomas Ian Nicholas; Joss Ackland; Art Malik
- Cinematography: Elemér Ragályi
- Edited by: Anita Brandt-Burgoyne; Michael Ripps
- Music by: J. A. C. Redford
- Production companies: Trimark Pictures; Tapestry Films
- Distributed by: Buena Vista Pictures Distribution (Note: Distributed under the Walt Disney Pictures banner in select territories, including North America.)
- Release date: August 11, 1995
- Running time: 89 minutes
- Countries: United Kingdom; United States
- Language: English
- Budget: $15 million
- Box office: $13.4 million (domestic)

A Kid in King Arthur's Court is a 1995 adventure comedy fantasy film directed by Michael Gottlieb (in his final directorial film before his death in 2014). It is loosely based on the Mark Twain 1889 novel A Connecticut Yankee in King Arthur's Court, previously filmed by Disney as Unidentified Flying Oddball in 1978. The film stars Thomas Ian Nicholas, Joss Ackland and Art Malik, and featured one of the first film roles of Daniel Craig and Kate Winslet.

In the film, a teenaged baseball player from the suburbs of Los Angeles is swallowed by the ground during an earthquake and time travels to the court of an elderly King Arthur in the 6th century. He is thought to be a messianic figure from Merlin's prophecies. The time-traveler develops a crush on young Princess Katey, but the girl is kidnapped in an effort to blackmail her older sister into marrying one of the courtiers.

== Plot ==
In the Los Angeles neighborhood of Reseda, 14-year-old Calvin Fuller is at a baseball game, standing at bat for his team, the Knights, ready for yet another strike out. Suddenly an earthquake hits; as the others run for safety, the ground opens up under Calvin's shoes and he falls through the chasm. He eventually lands on the head of a 6th-century black knight. Upon hearing of his miraculous appearance, the elderly King Arthur, seeing him as the savior whose appearance Merlin has predicted, dubs him "Calvin of Reseda" and invites him to dine with the court.

Calvin begins his knight training under Arthur's top knight, Sir Kane, to help Arthur retain his crown. When the earthquake hit, Calvin had just grabbed his knapsack, a fact that enables him to dazzle the people of Camelot with his futuristic "magic", including an introduction to rock and roll via CD player, a Swiss Army knife, and inline roller skates. His work wins him adulation and renown, but it also rouses the jealousy and disdain of Arthur’s advisor Lord Belasco, who is secretly scheming to take over the throne. Meanwhile, Calvin finds himself spending time and developing a crush on young Princess Katey, while her elder sister, Sarah, is secretly in love with Sir Kane. Belasco moves forward with his plans and kidnaps Katey and tries to frame Calvin for murder and tells Sarah that if she does not marry him, Katey will die. As Belasco is about to arrest Calvin, Sarah rescues him, tells him Katey is alive and to find her father and show him the proof. Calvin goes to Arthur and shows the proof of Belasco's scheme. Playing along, Arthur misdirects the knights and helps Calvin escape and they disguise themselves to go rescue Katey.

Walking amongst the people, Calvin tells Arthur that Belasco has been stealing from them for years and they think Arthur does not care about them, and Arthur vows to be a better king. Calvin and Arthur find the castle Katey is being held captive; during the fight, Calvin renews Arthur's will to fight by giving him Excalibur (gifted to Calvin by Merlin). They release Katey, but Belasco' second-in-command, Richard, kidnaps her again and holds her hostage over the moat. Calvin uses a laser pointer from his CD player to blind Richard, causing him to fall and save Katey. Arthur knights Calvin as a Knight of the Round Table and arrive back in Camelot to stop Belasco from forcing Sarah into marriage. To take Belasco down for good, Arthur holds a jousting tournament for Sarah's hand.

During the tournament, Sir Kane defeats all the opponents and just him and Belasco are in the finals. Belasco uses a magnifying crystal to use the sunlight to beam it into Kane's eyes and nearly knock him out. Sarah runs off in anger and Calvin asks Arthur to stall Belasco. Belasco is close to declaring his victory if Kane does not return, but Kane does return and faces him in another joust; Belasco knocks Kane's helmet off, but the now headless Kane still jousts and makes a comeback victory by knocking Belasco off his horse. However, it is not Kane, but Calvin, who pokes his head out from the large armor. Belasco pulls Calvin off the horse and tries to kill him, but the black knight that Calvin encountered earlier appears and ambushes Belasco, saving Calvin. Forfeiting his victory to the black knight, Calvin, Arthur, and all of Camelot are surprised to see the knight is Sarah herself; an astounded but happy Arthur rewards his daughter with the right to choose her own hand in marriage, and she proudly chooses Kane. Belasco is banished from Camelot forever.

Now that he has helped Arthur keep the Crown, Calvin has Merlin uphold his end of the bargain and send him home, and he sadly bids Arthur and Katey farewell. He is returned to the 20th century just before the moment when he struck out. Once he steps up to the plate, this time, he is ready and hits a home run. He is greeted by his teammates, including Katey, and is looked on by Arthur, who is whittling a piece of wood with a pocketknife – the same knife Calvin gave to him. The ball meanwhile sails into a chasm where Merlin catches Calvin’s home run and then breaks the fourth wall by stating "Taught the kid everything he knows."

== Cast ==
- Thomas Ian Nicholas as Calvin Fuller
- Joss Ackland as King Arthur
- Art Malik as Lord Belasco
- Paloma Baeza as Princess Katey, Arthur's younger daughter
- Kate Winslet as Princess Sarah, Arthur's older daughter
- Daniel Craig as Master Kane
- David Tysall as Ratan
- Ron Moody as Merlin
- Barry Stanton as Blacksmith
- Michael Mehlnan as Shop owner
- Melanie Oettinger as Peasant woman
- Rebecca Denton as Washer woman
- Michael Kelly as Apprentice
- Louise Rosner as Lady-in-waiting
- Paul Rosner as Peasant boy
- Béla Unger as Head guard
- Shane Rimmer as Coach
- Tim Wickham as Ricky Baker
- Daniel Bennett as Howell
- Debora Weston as Mom
- Vincent Marzello as Dad
- Catherine Blake as Maya
- J. P. Guerin as Umpire

== Production ==
Most of the 6th-century portion of the film was shot in Budapest, Hungary, while the majority of the 20th-century portion was filmed in late September 1994, at the softball field of London Central High School (LCHS), an American institution at RAF Daws Hill, High Wycombe, England.

== Release ==
The film was theatrically released in North America on August 11, 1995. It was accompanied in theaters by Walt Disney Feature Animation's short film Runaway Brain, featuring Mickey Mouse.

== Reception ==
Upon its release, the movie was panned by critics. It currently holds a rating of 5% on Rotten Tomatoes, based on 22 reviews, with an average rating of 3.6/10. The consensus reads: "Disappointing even by the relaxed standards of live-action children's entertainment, A Kid in King Arthur's Court stands as a rare near-total misfire from Disney." Metacritic has an approval rating of 34%, indicating "generally unfavorable" reviews. Audiences polled by CinemaScore gave the film an "A" grade on an A+ to F scale.

=== Box office ===
The movie debuted at No. 9. In the movie's second week it fell to No. 10.

== Sequel ==
A sequel titled A Kid in Aladdin's Palace without the involvement of Disney was released in 1998 as a direct-to-video film with Nicholas reprising his role as Calvin Fuller. The cast also included Rhona Mitra as Scheherazade, Nicholas Irons as Ali Baba, James Faulkner as Luxor, Taylor Negron as the Genie, Aharon Ipalé as Aladdin and Diana Kent as Jasmine.

== See also ==
- List of films based on Arthurian legend
