= A New Wave =

- DVD release poster
- Directed by: Jason Carvey
- Written by: Jason Carvey
- Produced by: Jason Carvey; Kambui Olujimi; Bruce Seymour
- Starring: Andrew Keegan; Lacey Chabert; John Krasinski; Dean Edwards; William Sadler; Caprice Benedetti; Wass Stevens; Thomas Edward Seymour; Russ Russo
- Cinematography: Kambui Olujimi
- Edited by: Christopher W. Doyle
- Distributed by: THINKFilm
- Release date: April 7, 2006 (Rome Independent Film Festival)
- Running time: 94 minutes
- Country: United States
- Language: English

A New Wave is a 2006 American heist comedy film written and directed by Jason Carvey.

== Plot ==
A would-be artist is working in a dead-end job as a bank teller. At the urging of his movie-obsessed slacker roommate, he agrees to be the inside man for a bank heist. While the heist plans are coordinated, the artist's girlfriend arranges for him to have his first gallery exhibition. But when he tries to stop the heist, the plan is too far into motion to be halted.

== Cast ==
Actor	Role
Andrew Keegan	Desmond
Lacey Chabert	Julie
John Krasinski	Gideon
Dean Edwards	Rupert
William Sadler	Mr. DeWitt
Caprice Benedetti	Mrs. DeWitt
Wass Stevens	Francois
Thomas Edward Seymour	Marv
Russ Russo	Julio Cortez

== Production ==
The film was shot in various locations throughout Connecticut.

== Reception ==
On the review aggregator website Rotten Tomatoes, 33% of 6 critics' reviews are positive.

Reviews for the film were mixed, with Film Threat cheering it as "a deceptive sleeper" while FilmCritic.com complained that it was "a post-modern pastiche of heist flick and comedy, the kind popularized by Reservoir Dogs and knocked off endlessly ever since it was released."

== Release ==
The film was a direct-to-DVD release, distributed by ThinkFilm.
