= Cruel World (film) =

- Theatrical release poster
- Directed by: Kelsey T. Howard
- Written by: Eugene Hess; Paul Lawrence; Paul T. Murray
- Produced by: Kelsey T. Howard; Todd Nealey; Tim Wesley
- Starring: Edward Furlong; Laura Ramsey; Daniel Franzese; Andrew Keegan
- Cinematography: Ward Russell
- Edited by: Andrew Cohen
- Music by: Danny Saber
- Production company: Primetime Pictures
- Distributed by: Indican Pictures; Echo Bridge Home Entertainment (old international releases); VMI Worldwide (new international releases, via Vantage Media); Vantage Media (United States)
- Release dates: October 14, 2005 (Screamfest); September 25, 2007
- Running time: 88 minutes
- Country: United States
- Language: English
- Box office: $17,986

Cruel World is a 2005 American independent splatter/comedy horror film starring Edward Furlong, Laura Ramsey, Daniel Franzese, Nate Parker, Brian Geraghty, and Jaime Pressly. It tells the story of a psychotic man who loses a reality game show and subsequently kills the host and then buys the house where the show took place to film his own reality show where the losers are killed rather than being sent home. The killings are done in serial killer style, and filmed as snuff films. The film combines elements of a typical slasher film with elements of reality television.

The film was met with negative reviews.

== Plot ==
Catherine Anderson, the former star of a reality show similar to The Bachelor called Lover's Lane, is now married and living with her husband Daniel in the house where the show took place. The house still has several secret rooms and passages, as well as a host of cameras all over the estate.

Philip Markham, who was a contestant on the show, comes to the home for a visit. Catherine is initially put off by his odd behavior, and feels more and more uncomfortable as Philip reminisces about the show. Philip tells Catherine he has sent out applications to colleges all over the country for his own reality show, which will take place in Catherine's house. Philip then murders Catherine and Daniel.

Later, the contestants—four men and five women—arrive as they receive a text stating "Please Leave Your Cell Phones By The Door". Philip reveals to them that after the first night he will not feed them. They go through different challenges, including locking themselves in coffins and trying to find the key inside. The challenges are more excessive than most reality show challenges, and often try to instill great fear into the contestants.

Initially, contestants are voted off the show. However, as the game goes on, they realize what is going on and start trying to escape. In either case, they are killed either by Philip or his brother Claude. Gradually all the contestants are eliminated except Jenny, on whom Claude has a crush.

After Jenny wins, she is taken back to the house and guarded by Claude. Knowing that Claude likes her, Jenny begins flirting with him, telling him that she loves him and kissing him. Claude lets her go, but Philip finds out and captures Jenny before she can escape. Jennifer's attempted escape attracts the attention of the police; Philip kills one, then escapes himself, telling Claude to stay. As Philip escapes, police enter the house and arrest Claude.

One year later, a reporter and her camera operator try to do a story on what Philip did in the house in question. They receive a message stating "Please Leave Your Cell Phones By The Door". This causes them to flee. Jenny and a friend walking into a monorail when a message appears on her cell phone stating "Please Leave Your Cell Phones By The Door" followed by Philip appearing on her phone. Jenny looks around to see if Philip is around. A hand grabs her by her shoulder as the monorail descends down the mountain.

== Cast ==
- Edward Furlong as Philip Markham
- Laura Ramsey as Jenny
- Susan Ward as Ashley
- Daniel Franzese as Claude Markham
- Andrew Keegan as Bobby
- Sanoe Lake as Ruby
- Aimee Garcia as Gina
- Joel Michaely as Jack
- Nate Parker as Techno
- Nicole Bilderback as Mikko
- Brian Geraghty as Collin
- Jaime Pressly as Catherine Anderson
- Sam Page as Daniel Anderson
- William Sterchi as Sheriff
- James Patrick Stuart as Deputy Grady
- Paige Green as Reporter
- Troy Nealey as Cameraman

== Production ==
The shooting of Cruel World began in July 2004 and took place in Albuquerque, New Mexico.

== Release ==
Cruel World was released on DVD April 8, 2008.

== Reception ==
James Bowman of The New York Sun called it "a dreadful mess of a movie" that unsuccessfully tried to mix satire with horror. Bloody Disgusting rated it 2/5 stars and wrote that the boring kills failed to make up for the poor writing and execution. Scott Foy of Dread Central rated it 1/5 stars and called it "simply an abject failure any which way you cut it." Mike Long of DVD Talk rated it 1.5/5 stars and wrote that the film had "an awesome concept" but "simply doesn't work."
