= The Broken Hearts Club =

2000 American comedy-drama film

- Theatrical release poster
- Directed by: Greg Berlanti
- Written by: Greg Berlanti
- Produced by: Mickey Liddell; Joseph Middleton
- Starring: Zach Braff; Dean Cain; Andrew Keegan; Nia Long; Mary McCormack; Matt McGrath; Timothy Olyphant; Billy Porter; Justin Theroux; Ben Weber; John Mahoney
- Cinematography: Paul Elliott
- Edited by: Todd Busch
- Music by: Christophe Beck
- Production companies: Banner Entertainment; Meanwhile Films
- Distributed by: Sony Pictures Classics
- Release dates: January 29, 2000 (Sundance); October 20, 2000 (United States)
- Running time: 94 minutes
- Country: United States
- Language: English
- Budget: $1 million
- Box office: $2 million

The Broken Hearts Club: A Romantic Comedy is a 2000 American romantic comedy drama film written and directed by Greg Berlanti. It follows the lives of a group of gay friends in West Hollywood, centered on a restaurant owned by the fatherly Jack (John Mahoney) and the softball team he sponsors. The friends rely on each other for friendship and support as they search for love, deal with loss, and discover themselves.

The Broken Hearts Club was Berlanti's first feature film, based on his circle of friends at the time. The movie was met with generally favorable reviews from critics, receiving praise for portraying homosexuality as normal and its characters as average gay men. The film focuses on "the universal themes of romance, acceptance and family", as opposed to AIDS, coming out, and sex, which are more controversial and stereotypical topics commonly covered in LGBT films.

== Plot ==
The film follows the lives of a group of gay friends in West Hollywood. Among the group is Dennis, a photographer who often holds the group together; Cole, a handsome, charismatic actor who — often unwittingly — ends up with other people's boyfriends; Benji, the youngest member of the group who has a penchant for gym-bodied men and who finds himself going through some bad times; Howie, a psychology student who is known for overthinking every situation; Patrick, the cynic of the group; and Taylor, who has just broken up with his long-term boyfriend.

Guiding them is restaurant owner Jack, who provides them with advice and jobs for some of them who work part-time as servers at his restaurant. But when tragedy strikes, and the group's newest member, 23-year-old Kevin, attempts to fit in, their friendships are put to the test.

== Cast ==
- John Mahoney as Jack
- Timothy Olyphant as Dennis
- Dean Cain as Cole
- Zach Braff as Benji
- Matt McGrath as Howie
- Ben Weber as Patrick
- Diane McBain as Josephine
- Billy Porter as Taylor
- Jennifer Coolidge as Betty
- Andrew Keegan as Kevin
- Nia Long as Leslie
- Mary McCormack as Anne
- Justin Theroux as Marshall
- Kerr Smith as catcher

== Production ==
=== Development ===
The Broken Hearts Club was written by Greg Berlanti about his own circle of friends at the time; the Howie/Marshall storyline is semi-autobiographical to a relationship Berlanti once had. The film had a working title of The Broken Hearts League as well as 8x10's, a term Berlanti's sister used to describe the men he dated.

=== Casting ===
The production was able to secure funding from the studio with the casting of John Mahoney and Timothy Olyphant. Dean Cain took a role against the wishes of his agents, who had cautioned him against playing a gay character. Billy Porter, who was the least known of the actors cast at the time, won the role of Taylor when he "[imbued] the character with heart and something real" in his audition. The film also stars Nia Long, Mary McCormack and Justin Theroux. It features a cameo from Kerr Smith, who knew Berlanti as the showrunner on Dawson's Creek and enjoyed the script so much he asked to be a part of the film. Jennifer Coolidge was cast as the hairdresser Betty, to whom all the guys, with the exception of Howie, go for hair therapy.

=== Filming ===
Filming began in October 1999 and took place over the course of thirteen days on a $1 million budget. The movie was filmed in Los Angeles and West Hollywood, while restaurant exteriors and interiors were shot in Long Beach. The hardware store scene was filmed in Laurel Hardware Company in West Hollywood. The film was distributed by Sony Pictures Entertainment and its subsidiary Sony Pictures Classics and produced by Banner Entertainment and Meanwhile Films.

=== Music ===
The original music for The Broken Hearts Club was scored by Canadian composer Christophe Beck. The film also made use of songs by The Carpenters, covered by Mary Beth Maziarz. On September 19, 2000, WILL Records (now Lakeshore Records) released the film's soundtrack.

1. "Love Machine, Part 1" – The Miracles
2. "From Here to Eternity" (radio edit) – Giorgio Moroder vs. Danny Tenaglia
3. "Let the Music Play" (Junior Vasquez Mix) – Shannon
4. "Beg for It" (Mad Tizzy Mix) – Barry Harris
5. "Time for Love" – Kim English
6. "Share My Joy" – GTS featuring Loleatta Holloway
7. "Learn2Love" – Kim English
8. "Young Hearts Run Free" – Kym Mazelle
9. "(They Long to Be) Close to You" – Mary Beth Maziarz
10. "We've Only Just Begun" – Mary Beth Maziarz

== Release ==
The film premiered at the Sundance Film Festival on January 29, 2000. It received a limited release on September 29, 2000, followed by a wide release on October 20, 2000. The Broken Hearts Club was released on Region 1 DVD by Sony Pictures on March 6, 2001 and on Region 2 DVD.

== Reception ==
=== Box office ===
In its opening weekend, showing at seven theaters, the film made $109,694. Two weeks later, the film made $153,468 as it reached twenty-eight screens and the week later, it grossed $175,553 as it reached fifty-six. In its eighth week of release, The Broken Hearts Club played at sixty-two theaters. The film's domestic gross totaled $1,746,585 after twelve weeks of release. The movie was released in a number of countries in 2001 and played at various gay and lesbian film festivals worldwide. The Broken Hearts Club grossed $272,536 outside of the United States, bringing its worldwide gross to $2,019,121.

=== Critical response ===
The movie review website Rotten Tomatoes reports a 64% approval rating, based on 28 reviews, with an average score of 6.03/10. The site's consensus states that the film "often feels like an amalgam of 70s sitcoms – though a hunky lead and a sweet central romance provide soapy delights". According to Metacritic, the film has scored 51% based on 17 reviews, indicating mixed or average reviews. Film critic Roger Ebert gave the film three stars out of four, praising the film's positivity and "the ordinariness of its characters and what they talk about." Ebert noted that "instead of angst, Freudian analysis, despair and self-hate, the new generation sounds like the cast of a sitcom, trading laugh lines and fuzzy truisms." CNN's Paul Clinton also lauded The Broken Hearts Club for focusing on "the universal themes of romance, acceptance and family", as opposed to AIDS, coming out, and sex. Clinton viewed the film as "reminiscent of those classic films that explored the complex dynamics of friendship", calling it "a heartwarming, glorious movie for anyone who has ever had a friend – or a family."

Lisa Schwarzbaum from Entertainment Weekly called it "a majority oriented movie that assumes sophisticated familiarity with a sexual minority". Jami Bernard from Daily News commented "It's the first mainstream gay movie that feels totally comfortable in its shoes". Desmond Ryan from Philadelphia Inquirer described the film as having an "undemanding and reassuring amiability that made it a crowd-pleaser at Sundance."

On the other hand, Mick LaSalle of the San Francisco Chronicle felt the characters were "boring" and "uninteresting". Bob Longino of The Atlanta Journal-Constitution summarized the movie as "sometimes funny, sometimes a yawn".

The film was often compared to the 1970s film The Boys in the Band, directed by William Friedkin, although Ebert and LaSalle both felt that The Broken Hearts Club was generally more upbeat and optimistic. Schwarzbaum of Entertainment Weekly exclaimed that the film shows "how far homosexual characters have come since The Boys in the Band, sad AIDS dramas, and cute identity peekaboo sitcoms". Longino, however, commented that "Broken Hearts doesn't break much new ground. Actually, The Boys in the Band did the groundbreaking 30 years ago."

=== Accolades ===
Year	Organization	Award	Category	Result	Ref.
2001	Casting Society of America	Artios Awards	Best Casting for Feature Film, Independent	Nominated	
2001	Gay & Lesbian Alliance Against Defamation	GLAAD Media Awards	Outstanding Film (Limited Release)	Won	
