= Waiting for Dublin =

2007 American film

- Theatrical release poster
- Directed by: Roger Tucker
- Written by: Chuck Conaway
- Produced by: Paul Breuls; Catherine Vandeleene
- Starring: Andrew Keegan; Hugh O'Conor; Jade Yourell
- Cinematography: Marc Felperlaan
- Edited by: Les Healey
- Music by: Alfred Van Acker
- Production company: Corsan
- Distributed by: Cinema Libre Studio
- Release dates: June 2007 (SIFF); March 13, 2009 (United States)
- Running time: 83 minutes
- Countries: Belgium; Netherlands; United Kingdom; Ireland
- Language: English
- Budget: $6 million
- Box office: $5,925

Waiting for Dublin is a 2007 war romantic comedy film directed by Roger Tucker and starring Andrew Keegan, Hugh O'Conor and Jade Yourell. The film follows Mike Clarke (Keegan), an American pilot in the midst of World War II who makes an emergency landing in a remote Ireland village during a bet and starts a romantic relationship with one of the villagers.

Originally entering production in 2003, Waiting for Dublin's production was troubled due to multiple financing issues, causing filming to be delayed by three years. Film studio Corsan resumed production with a new crew in 2006, which led to protests by the film's original crew.

Waiting for Dublin premiered at the Shanghai International Film Festival in June 2007 and received a limited theatrical release from Cinema Libre Studio on March 13, 2009.

== Premise ==
On New Year's Eve in 1944, World War II American pilot Mike Clarke makes a bet with the nephew of gangster Al Capone that he can shoot down five enemy aircraft. After shooting down four planes, Mike emergency lands in a remote village in Ireland after running out of fuel. While trying to finish the bet, he befriends the villagers and strikes up a romantic relationship with one of them, Maggie.

== Cast ==
- Andrew Keegan as Mike Clarke
- Jade Yourell as Maggie
- Hugh O'Conor as Twickers
- Guido De Craene as Kluge
- Jenne Decleir as Dinky
- Frank Kelly as Thaddius
- Des Braiden as Father Quinlan
- Pat Laffan as Paddy
- Jack Lynch as Mr. Kelleher
- Britta Smith as Mrs. Kelleher
- Don Foley as Eamonn
- Kevin Flood as Dr. Mahoney
- David Wilmot as Heneghan
- Tristan Hickey as Major Forbes
- Karl Shiels as Vito
- Joe Cassidy as Scarface
- Joe Gallagher as Ronan
- Sheila Flitton as Old Crone
- Siobhan Kelly as Cigarette Girl

== Production ==
Waiting for Dublin originally been filming in 2003 in Ireland before production was paused in March due to financial issues. In October 2006, production company Corsan acquired the film and chose to resume production. Multiple of the film's original crew from 2003 were not notified of production resuming, prompting them to make an appearance on the RTÉ Radio 1 talk show Liveline in protest. The Irish Film Technicians Association began picketing at the Man O'War Pub in Dublin, where the film was being shot. Speaking to the Boston Herald about the film's lengthy production, lead actor Keegan said, "Four-and-a-half years later we came back to finish it in Dublin and that was two years ago from where we are now. It’s been seven years, can you imagine? What a crazy experience."

Waiting for Dublin had a production budget of $6 million.

== Release ==
Waiting for Dublin premiered at the Shanghai International Film Festival in June 2007, and received a limited theatrical release from Cinema Libre Studio on March 13, 2009. The film was released on Blu-ray on March 1, 2011.

== Reception ==
=== Box office ===
During the weekend of March 13–15, 2009, Waiting for Dublin was released in four theaters in the United States and grossed $4,183. It ended its run with a domestic gross of $5,925.

=== Critical response ===
On the review aggregator website Rotten Tomatoes, 7% of 14 critics' reviews are positive.

The film won the Seahorse Award (Best Feature Film by male filmmakers) and the Audience Award at the Moondance International Film Festival.

Roger Ebert of the Chicago Sun-Times gave the film a mixed review, calling it "constructed entirely with cliches and stereotypes," but praising the film's acting and film locations. Tasha Robinson of The A.V. Club gave the film a negative review, criticizing its "forced, manic tone" and "shrill amateurishness," and calling it "one of those romantic comedies that’s neither romantic nor comedic." Robert Koehler of Variety also gave the film a negative review, stating that "it’s hard to think of a faker replication of WWII in the movies," although he praised Yourell's performance.

In contrast, Nathan Lee of The New York Times gave the film a positive review, praising the film's visuals, although he criticized the acting and script.
