= Burlesque Fairytales =

2009 British thriller film

- Theatrical release poster
- Directed by: Susan Luciani
- Written by: Susan Luciani
- Produced by: Lindsay McFarlane
- Starring: See full list below
- Cinematography: Derek Suter
- Edited by: Claus Wehlisch
- Music by: Nicholas Singer
- Production company: Double Barrel Productions
- Release date: 7 June 2009 (STIFF)
- Running time: 72 minutes
- Country: United Kingdom
- Language: English
- Budget: £35,000

Burlesque Fairytales is a 2009 British thriller film written and directed by Susan Luciani set in a fictional 1930s London theatre. It stars an ensemble cast and premiered at Seattle's True Independent Film Festival on 7 June 2009.

== Cast ==
- Anna Andresen as The Mermaid
- Esmé Bianco as Mother
- Stephen Campbell Moore as Peter Blythe-Smith
- Jim Carter as The Compere
- Benedict Cumberbatch as Henry Clark
- Lindsay Duncan as Ice Queen
- Barbara Flynn as Mrs Argyle
- Mona Hammond as Death's Wife
- Kevin Howarth as Jimmy Harrison
- Sophie Hunter as Annabel Blythe-Smith

== Production ==
Produced by Double Barrel Productions, the film is Susan Luciani's directorial debut and was shot in 19 days at Pinewood Studios.

== Release ==
The film premiered at Seattle's True Independent Film Festival on 7 June 2009.
