= The Activated Man =

2023 American film

- Official poster
- Directed by: Nicholas Gyeney
- Written by: Nicholas Gyeney
- Produced by: Nicholas Gyeney; Kelsey Aho; Judy Fox; Jared Safier; Thomas Walton
- Starring: Tony Todd; Andrew Keegan; Sab Shimono; Vladimir Kulich; Sean Young; Kane Hodder
- Cinematography: William Hellmuth
- Edited by: Chad Eade
- Music by: Cesar Beitia
- Production companies: Genie; Mirror Images Limited; Safier Entertainment
- Distributed by: Stonecutter Media
- Release dates: November 2, 2023 (DTLAFF); December 13, 2024 (theatrical)
- Running time: 115 minutes
- Country: United States
- Language: English
- Box office: $28,743

The Activated Man is a 2023 American psychological horror film directed and written by Nicholas Gyeney and starring Tony Todd, Andrew Keegan, Sab Shimono, Vladimir Kulich, Sean Young and Kane Hodder. The film follows Ors Gabriel (Jamie Costa), a man who has multiple hallucinations after his dog dies due to cancer.

The Activated Man premiered at the Downtown Los Angeles Film Festival on November 2, 2023, and received a limited theatrical release on December 13, 2024.

== Plot ==
After Ors loses his pet dog to cancer, the trauma produces strange visions that force him to consider two possibilities: that the visions are real or simply just imaginary.

The movie begins with a boy picking up a book at a bookstore.

We cut to a newscaster asserting a pattern in nationwide murder-suicides over the years. We cut to Ors Gabriel (Jamie Costa), grieving the loss of his dog to cancer.

Since his dog’s death, he has started hallucinating, particularly a man in black, later dubbed Fedora Man (Edward Michael Scott), though he wears a cordobes.

A tall neighbor (Tony Todd) who knows more than he should about Ors introduces himself as Jeffrey Bowman and offers grief counseling. Ors’s live-in girlfriend, Sarah Reeve (Ivana Rojas), is a cop assigned to the latest murder-suicide case. She doesn’t see any of the people Ors hallucinates.

Ors visits his mother, Agnes Gabriel (Sean Young), in an asylum. Drawings of Fedora Man hang on the wall of her room. He fails to elicit a response until he communicates with her telepathically—a first for both. She reveals that Ors’s father, Laszlo Gabriel (Kane Hodder), is evil and that after she separated from him, Fedora Man attacked her, driving her into the asylum. She gives Ors a (rather feeble) pep talk to be strong against Fedora Man and not succumb to fear.

Laszlo attempts to murder Sarah in a hit-and-run after Fedora Man whispers in Sarah's ear to walk into traffic. She survives but must be taken to the ER.

Jeffrey tells Ors he found a book in Laszlo’s apartment (via telepathic projection) that explains everything. Ors uses telepathy to get the address out of him. Ors finds the book is a compilation of news clippings of murder-suicides. Ors infers his own father is Fedora Man, the one who telepathically causes the crimes. Laszlo returns to his apartment and explains to his son that the purpose of his mission was to terminate those with potential telepathic powers before they learned to use telepathy to fight. We learn in flashbacks that Laszlo and Jeffrey knew each other from CIA work on weaponizing telepaths, à la “Dreamscape." Some fight scenes ensue.

Jeffrey encourages Ors to tell the story of Fedora Man and the rest of it to warn other potential telepaths.

Sarah and Ors find a dog that looks like the dog he lost. It was abandoned by a 13-year-old who was trying to rescue it from her abusive parents. Sarah and Ors take the dog home.

We cut to the boy back in the bookstore. The book he holds is by Ors, thus fulfilling Jeffrey’s directive to tell his story to the next generation of telepaths.

== Cast ==
- Tony Todd as Jeffrey Bowman
- Jamie Costa as Ors Gabriel
- Ivana Rojas as Sarah Reeve
- Andrew Keegan as Kit Waller
- Sab Shimono as Mr. Hideyoshi
- Sonia Jackson as The Nurse
- Vladimir Kulich as Wendigo
- Scott Brown as The Fedora Man
- Sean Young as Agnes Gabriel
- Kane Hodder as Laszlo Gabriel
- Takayo Fischer as Mrs. Hideyoshi

== Production ==
The Activated Man featured Tony Todd's final leading role in a theatrical release, before his death in November 2024.

== Release ==
In October 2024, Stonecutter Media acquired North American distribution rights for the film, giving it a limited theatrical release on December 13, 2024, while also simultaneously releasing the film on demand.

== Reception ==
=== Box office ===
The Activated Man was released in 13 theaters during its opening weekend, grossing $13,182 and ranking 39th at the box office during the weekend of December 13–15.

=== Critical response ===
Michael Talbot-Haynes of Film Threat gave the film a highly positive review, praising its "slick, functional style that maintains focus."

A review at Pop Horror concluded, "It’s a nice-looking film: a polished effort with some nice visual FX and an effective musical score. The cast is solid, the high point, really, and the villain is memorable. For all it has going for it, however, the whole for me did not equal the sum of its parts."

Mary Cusak for City Pulse, in another mixed review, praised Todd's performance.
