= The Last Boy Scout =

1991 film by Tony Scott

- Theatrical release poster
- Directed by: Tony Scott
- Screenplay by: Shane Black
- Story by: Shane Black; Greg Hicks
- Produced by: Joel Silver; Michael Levy
- Starring: Bruce Willis; Damon Wayans; Chelsea Field; Noble Willingham; Taylor Negron; Danielle Harris
- Cinematography: Ward Russell
- Edited by: Stuart Baird; Mark Goldblatt; Mark Helfrich
- Music by: Michael Kamen
- Production companies: Geffen Pictures; Silver Pictures
- Distributed by: Warner Bros.
- Release date: December 13, 1991
- Running time: 105 minutes
- Country: United States
- Language: English
- Budget: $43 million
- Box office: $114.5 million

The Last Boy Scout is a 1991 American action comedy film directed by Tony Scott from a screenplay by Shane Black, and produced by Joel Silver. It stars Bruce Willis and Damon Wayans, Halle Berry, Noble Willingham, Chelsea Field, Taylor Negron, and Danielle Harris. The neo-noir film follows a washed-up private investigator (Willis) who teams up with a disgraced former football star (Wayans) to uncover a political conspiracy involving their former employers.

The film was released by Warner Bros. in the United States on December 13, 1991, to mixed reviews and a smaller than expected box office. Retrospective reviews have been more positive, and the film has developed a cult following.

== Plot ==
During halftime at a football game, Los Angeles Stallions running back Billy Cole receives a call from Milo, a man who warns him to win the game or he will be killed. Cole ingests PCP and in a drug-induced rage, carries a gun onto the field, shooting three opposing players to reach the end zone before shooting himself in the head. Meanwhile, private investigator Joe Hallenbeck, a disgraced former Secret Service agent who was once a national hero for saving the President from an assassination attempt, discovers that his wife Sarah is having an affair with his best friend and business partner, Mike Matthews. After a confrontation, Mike gives Joe an assignment to act as bodyguard for a stripper named Cory. Mike is then killed by a car bomb outside Joe's house.

That night at a strip club, Joe is approached by Cory's boyfriend, former Stallions quarterback Jimmy Dix, who was banned from the league on gambling charges and alleged drug abuse. While Cory and Jimmy exchange conversations, Joe waits outdoors and is eventually knocked unconscious by a team of hitmen. Jimmy and Cory leave the bar in separate cars while Joe overpowers the hitman left to dispatch him. When Cory is struck from behind and stops to confront the other driver, she is killed by the hitmen. Joe eliminates two of them as the other one retreats and Jimmy is saved. The pair are interrogated by lieutenant Benjamin Bessalo, and he grows dubious of Joe's behavior.

Acting on a hunch at Cory's apartment, Jimmy and Joe find a taped phone conversation between Senator Calvin Baynard, who leads a congressional investigation into sports gambling, and Stallions owner Sheldon Marcone. When Joe was in the Secret Service, he witnessed Baynard torturing a woman in a hotel room and assaulted the senator to liberate her. Baynard retaliated by having Joe fired for refusing to cover up the incident. When the tape is ruined in Joe's faulty car stereo, Jimmy realizes that Cory tried using the tape against Marcone to reinstate Jimmy on the team, prompting Marcone to send the hitmen. Joe saves Jimmy from a second car bomb, and tricks two hitmen into blowing themselves up. However, the explosion destroys the remaining evidence.

At Joe's house, Jimmy attempts to use cocaine in the bathroom. However, Joe catches Jimmy and kicks him out. As Jimmy leaves, Joe's daughter Darian asks him to sign a football trading card. She states that Joe was a fan of Jimmy's and never watched another game after he was excluded from the league.

Learning of Mike's affair with Sarah, the police assume that Joe killed him and move to make an arrest. Milo, Marcone's top henchman, captures Joe first and shoots detective McClusky with Joe's gun. Marcone has been purchasing senate votes to legalize sports gambling, but Baynard tried to blackmail Marcone for $6 million. Aware of Joe's history with Baynard, Marcone explains it would be cheaper to kill the senator and frame Joe for the murder. Joe is taken to a wooded area and forced to hand a briefcase with money to Baynard's bodyguards, and Marcone's men surreptitiously switch it with a briefcase containing a bomb. Joe is rescued by Jimmy and Darian, and acquires both briefcases after running the bodyguards and Milo off the road. However, Milo survives and while Darian is left to wait for the police, she is abducted by Milo.

Heading to the stadium to rescue Darian, Joe and Jimmy are captured and escorted to Marcone's office. Jimmy creates a diversion, allowing them to fight their way free. Realizing that Milo plans to shoot Baynard, Joe goes after Milo while sending Jimmy to warn the senator. Grabbing the game ball, Jimmy throws it at Baynard, knocking him down just as Milo starts to open fire. Joe pushes Milo to the edge of the stadium light platform, where SWAT officers shoot him before he falls into the moving rotor blades of a police helicopter. The briefcase of money is recovered and Marcone, having escaped with the rigged briefcase, is killed when he opens it at his estate. The next day, Joe and Sarah reconcile, and Joe and Jimmy decide to become partners.

== Cast ==
- Bruce Willis as Joseph Cornelius "Joe" Hallenbeck
- Damon Wayans as James Alexander "Jimmy" Dix
- Chelsea Field as Sarah Hallenbeck
- Noble Willingham as Sheldon "Shelly" Marcone
- Taylor Negron as Milo
- Danielle Harris as Darian Hallenbeck
- Halle Berry as Cory
- Bruce McGill as Mike Matthews
- Badja Djola as alley thug
- Kim Coates as Chet
- Chelcie Ross as Senator Calvin Baynard
- Joe Santos as Lieutenant Ben Bessalo
- Clarence Felder as Detective Mick McCaskey
- Tony Longo as Ray "Big Ray" Walton
- Frank Collison as Pablo
- Billy Blanks as Billy Cole

Other actors in the film include Eddie Griffin as the strip club DJ, Sara Suzanne Brown as a stripper, Ryan Cutrona as Harp, Michael Papajohn as a hitman, Jack Kehler as the Scrabble man, Manny Perry as cigar thug, Rick Ducommun as the pool owner, and Morris Chestnut as the locker room kid. The movie also stars James Gandolfini as a hitman in one of his earliest roles.

Singer Bill Medley and sports commentators Verne Lundquist, Dick Butkus and Lynn Swann appear as themselves.

== Production ==
=== Development and writing ===
The film was based on an original script by Shane Black. He wrote the script after having taken a two-year break from writing, triggered in part by the end of a relationship. The Geffen Film Company outbid other companies, paying a record $1.75 million for the script, with over a $1 million guaranteed up front. Black later recalled:

I was busy mourning my life and, in many ways, the loss of my first real love. I didn't feel much like doing anything except smoking cigarettes and reading paperbacks. All things come around. Time passed and eventually I sat down and transformed some of that bitterness into a character, the central focus of a private eye story which became The Last Boy Scout. Writing that script was a very cathartic experience, one of the best experiences I've ever had. I spent so much time alone working on that. Days which I wouldn't speak. Three, four days where I maybe said a couple words. It was a wonderfully intense time where my focus was better than it's ever been. And I was rewarded so handsomely ($1.75 million) for that script, it felt like a vindication and like I was back on track.

Roger Ebert, commenting on the script, said "The original screenplay for The Last Boy Scout set a record for its purchase price; that was probably because of the humor of the locker-room dialogue, since the plot itself could have been rewritten out of the Lethal Weapon movies by any film school grad."

Joel Silver was guaranteed $1 million to produce. Silver said in a Q&A for The Nice Guys (2016) that Shane Black's original title for the film was Die Hard. Silver asked if he could take the title for a project he was working on at the time called Nothing Lasts Forever, which eventually became Die Hard (1988).

=== Filming ===
The Last Boy Scout was filmed in 90 days between March 11 and June 9, 1991. Filming took place primarily in and around Los Angeles, California. The football stadium scenes were filmed at the Los Angeles Memorial Coliseum and San Diego Stadium.

The movie had a very troubled production. Conflict and arguments flared between Joel Silver, Bruce Willis and Tony Scott. Although they partner up in the film, Willis and Damon Wayans really disliked working with each other. Silver was described by Sylvester Stallone as "insane, with long, horrible fits of sanity," and was compared to a fighter pilot riding as a passenger: "As soon as you hit a little bit of turbulence, he's right away going to throw the guy out of the window and take over the steering." Taylor Negron also remarked that Silver was directly involved throughout the production.

Assistant director James Skotchdopole attributed the tension on-set to an "overabundance of alpha males on that project. Bruce was at the height of his stardom, so was Joel, so was Tony and so was Shane. There were a lot of people who had a lot of opinions about what to do. There were some heated, early-Nineties, testosterone charged personalities on the line. It was a 'charged environment,' shall we say." Writer Shane Black had to wrestle with the script. "I was forced to do more rewriting on that movie than on anything else I've done. There was tremendous pressure from the studio to get Bruce Willis and have this be a follow-up to Die Hard. He was reluctant, and rightly so: 'This whole movie is about me saving my wife. I just did that in Die Hard.' So they said, 'OK, let's minimize the wife and, and while we're at it, add a big finale.' There was a general pressure to somehow make it bigger."

=== Editing ===
More problems emerged during post-production, when the original cut of the film turned out be a "borderline unwatchable workprint." Different editors were hired in an attempt to address Scott's tendency for filming excessive coverage with multiple cameras. Editor Mark Helfrich described sorting through "mountains of raw material" to edit the first cut: "There was more footage shot for The Last Boy Scout than on any film I had ever worked on." He recalled with incredulity that the work of previous editors appeared to have been rejected, taken apart and put back into the daily reels: "There were still splices all over the place." Veteran action film editor Mark Goldblatt was also brought in to work on the film. He later referred to the experience as one of the most frustrating jobs of his career and has often declined to discuss it in detail, although he did mention in a podcast interview that several editors were hired and then fired before him, and that Warner Bros. began testing the movie before it was completely finished. Studio executives fretted about the expanding budget, while less-than-enthusiastic reactions from a test screening audience, as well as the unlikeable character played by Willis, did little to allay these concerns.

When editor Stuart Baird was hired, the film finally took a positive turn. Baird had been brought in to help re-edit other troubled productions, including Tango & Cash (1989) and Demolition Man (1993). Some later cuts were done with the film's graphic scenes after it was originally rated NC-17, which explains quick-cut edits in some of the death scenes in the film.

=== Music ===
The film's score was composed and conducted by Michael Kamen (who also scored Hudson Hawk that year), his only work for Tony Scott. Bill Medley performed the song "Friday Night's a Great Night for Football", written by Steve Dorff and John Bettis, on screen during the opening credits (the song is also reprised over the end titles); the song was released as a CD single by Curb Records.

On August 25, 2015, La-La Land Records released a limited edition soundtrack album featuring most of Kamen's score, plus Medley's song.

== Reception ==
=== Box office ===
The film under-performed expectations given the star power and hype surrounding the then record price paid for the screenplay by Shane Black ($1.75 million). It grossed $7.9 million in its opening weekend, and the total gross in the United States and Canada was $59.5 million. Internationally, the film grossed $55 million for a worldwide gross of $114.5 million. Reviews were mixed, and some critics cited the Christmas time release for such a violent film as a reason for its somewhat underwhelming box office. Although the film was not a blockbuster, it helped Bruce Willis recover his star status after the disastrous Hudson Hawk and became hugely popular in the video rental market.

=== Critical response ===
On Rotten Tomatoes the film has an approval rating of 50% based on 44 reviews, with an average rating of 5.5/10. The site's critical consensus reads: "The Last Boy Scout is as explosive, silly, and fun as it does represent the decline of the buddy-cop genre." On Metacritic the film has a weighted average score of 52 out of 100, based on 22 critics, indicating "mixed or average reviews". Audiences polled by CinemaScore gave the film an average grade of "B+" on an A+ to F scale.

Roger Ebert gave the film three stars out of four, saying it was "a superb example of what it is: a glossy, skillful, cynical, smart, utterly corrupt and vilely misogynistic action thriller." Owen Gleiberman praised it as "a cheerfully disreputable buddy thriller that also happens to be one of the most entertaining movies of the season ... [and] gives the actors room to stretch out." Variety described the plot as "a haze of barely connected story lines about political corruption, pro-football, gambling, infidelity, and blackmail [where] all the questions are answered by another car chase, smashing someone in the face or shooting someone in the forehead." In a highly critical review, Desson Howe of The Washington Post called it "the filmic equivalent of a hate crime. ... It's mindless, anti-civilization formula for boys who can't get enough."

Retrospective reviews praised the writing, the direction, and the chemistry between Willis and Wayans, and some critics noted it as one of the best films in Scott's catalog. In 2022, Alan Sepinwall from Rolling Stone included The Last Boy Scout on The Best of Bruce Willis: 10 Memorables TV and Movie Performances and said: "The neo-noir thriller The Last Boy Scout is on some level (also) trash — bookended by wildly over-the-top action sequences at football stadiums — elevated not only by director Tony Scott's self-awareness of how ridiculous it all is, but by the sheer force of Willis' performance as a disgraced Secret Service agent turned seedy private detective".

=== Creator response ===
Looking back on the film, director Tony Scott stated: “It didn’t do that great. Having said that, it did about a hundred million, which by today’s standards is not great. Going in, the expectations were higher. I’m not quite sure why it didn’t do better, because Bruce Willis was great in it. He had a solid handle on who his character was—this real anti-hero. And the little girl who played Bruce’s daughter [Danielle Harris] was brilliant. I was surprised it didn’t do better than it did.”

In later years, both Scott and screenwriter Shane Black expressed dissatisfaction with the finished film, believing that Black’s original screenplay was significantly stronger. Scott accused Joel Silver of interfering with the production and swore off working with Silver again. His next film, True Romance, features an unflattering film producer character patterned after Silver.

=== Accolades ===
The film was nominated for two MTV Movie Awards.

- Best Action Sequence – For the helicopter blade sequence
- Best On-Screen Duo – Bruce Willis & Damon Wayans

== Home media ==
The 4K UHD Blu-ray was released on October 13, 2026, by Arrow Video. The release contains a 4K restoration of the film approved by cinematographer Ward Russell, interviews with screenwriter Shane Black and actress Danielle Harris, and additional scenes from the workprint of the film containing additional violence and gore that was removed from the final cut.
