= Anna Alimani =

American model and actress

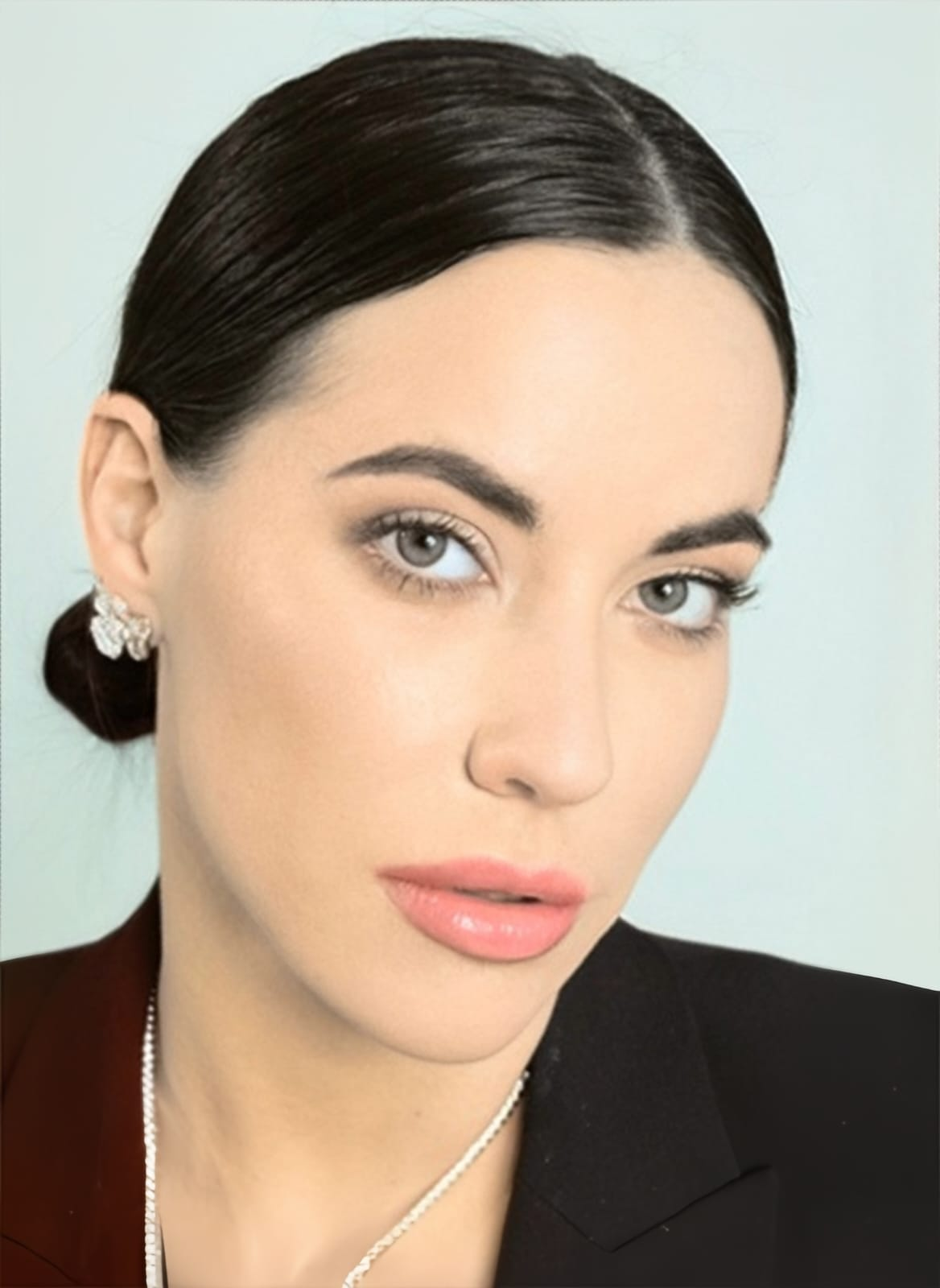

Anna Alimani is an American model, and actress based in New York City. She has appeared in international runway shows, editorial campaigns, film productions, and television series, including the Netflix reality series Owning Manhattan (2024).

== Early life and education ==
Alimani earned a Bachelor of Science in business administration from Purdue University, where she was named to the President’s Honor Roll. She later pursued executive education studies at Columbia Business School.

== Career ==
=== Modeling ===
Alimani has worked in runway and editorial modeling across New York, Paris, Milan, and Portofino. She has walked runway shows for designers including Christian Siriano and Christina Cowan. Her modeling credits include campaigns for the Italian fashion brand Kiton.

She has appeared on the covers of L’Officiel Baltic, L’Officiel India, Glamour Bulgaria, and Vogue Latin America. She has attended major international industry events, including the Cannes Film Festival, the Golden Globe Awards, the Tony Awards, and the amfAR Gala. Her red carpet appearances have been photographed for publications such as Vogue, Harper’s Bazaar, Marie Claire, Grazia, InStyle, and Women’s Wear Daily.

=== Acting and production ===
Alimani is a member of SAG-AFTRA. Her film credits include The Retaliators and Kindred Vampire Tales: Vamp City. She portrayed Amanda Sutherland in Good Knight and Lisa in the 2025 film Unholy Song, for which she also served as associate producer.

Her television appearances include Jennifer Day TV and a self-appearance on the Netflix series Owning Manhattan (2024). She also served as associate producer on Sex Before Church and Offsides, appearing as Sierra in the latter.

=== Philanthropy ===
Alimani is the founder of Women of the Phoenix, a nonprofit organisation focused on mentorship and professional development for women. She is reportedly a member of the New York Junior League and the New York City Ballet Young Patrons Circle.
