= Esmé Bianco =

British actress

Esme Bianco
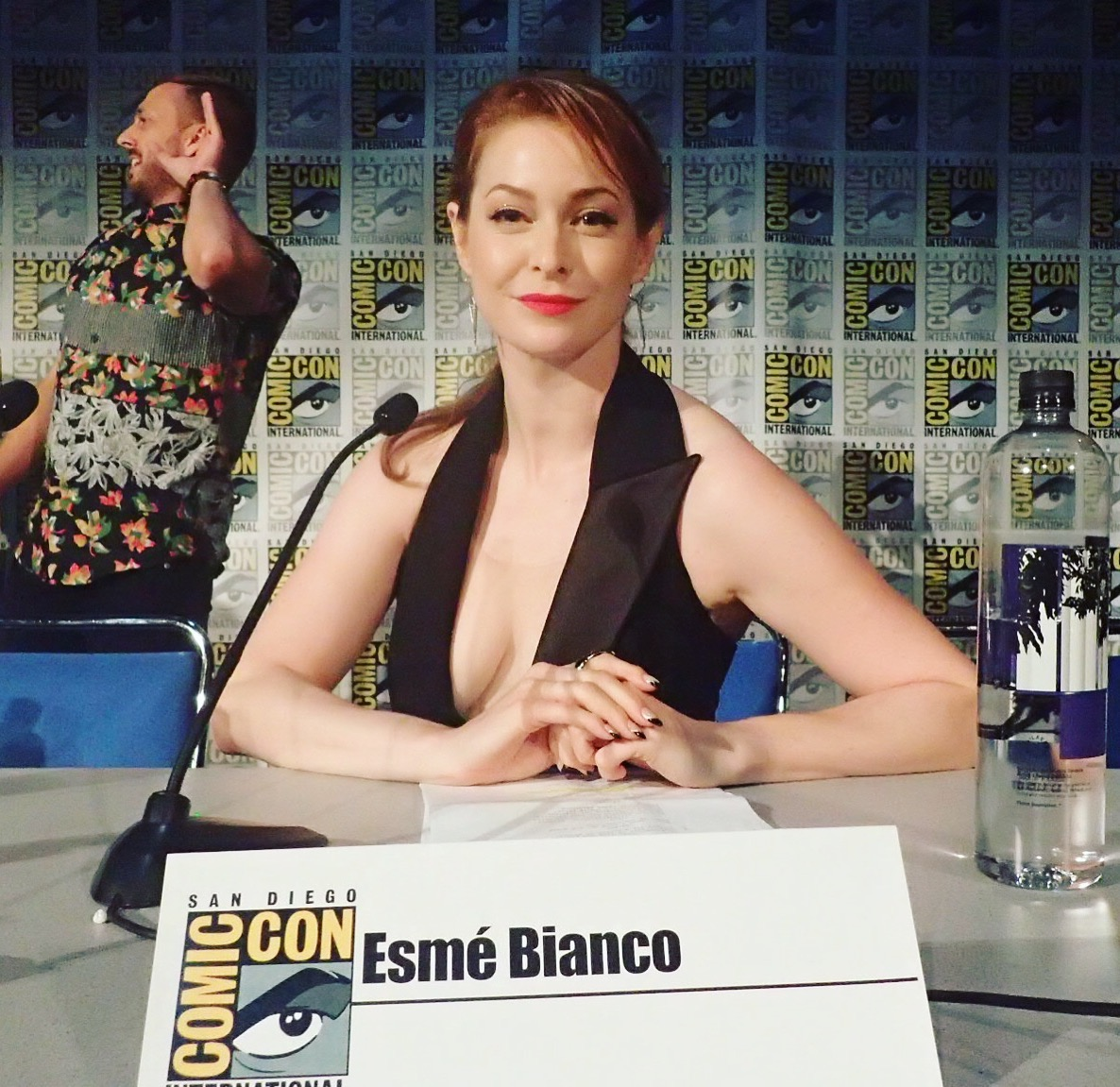
- Bianco in 2018
- Born: Esmé Augusta Bianco; St Albans, Hertfordshire, England
- Occupations: Actress; neo-burlesque performer
- Years active: 2007–present

Esmé Augusta Bianco is an English actress and neo-burlesque performer, who is best known for her recurring roles as Ros on Game of Thrones and Jane Chatwin on The Magicians.

== Career ==
Bianco has posed for painters Christian Furr and Peregrine Heathcote.

Bianco appeared in feature films, including Burlesque Fairytales, in which she played "Mother" in one of the tales. She also appeared in Chemical Wedding, Dead Man Running, The Big I Am, and The Scorpion King 4: Quest for Power. Bianco played the role of prostitute Ros in the HBO series Game of Thrones. She first appeared in the series premiere "Winter Is Coming" and returned for 13 more episodes, being often featured in the show's "sexposition" scenes.

In 2020, Bianco appeared as a guest vocalist on the Puscifer album Existential Reckoning on the song "UPGrade".

== Personal life ==
In February 2021, Bianco accused musician Marilyn Manson of physically abusing her during their relationship in 2011, after she had split from her husband. In April 2021, Bianco sued Manson for sexual assault, human trafficking, and abuse. Bianco alleged that she was given drugs and alcohol, and also subjected to threats of violence and rape. Bianco also alleged that Manson tied her to a prayer kneeler, beat her with a whip, and raped her. Marilyn Manson responded to Bianco through his attorney, stating that Bianco's allegations were "provably false." They reached an out-of-court settlement in January 2023, with the terms of agreement not disclosed.

== Filmography ==
=== Film ===
Year	Title	Role	Notes
2006	Dolls	Mouche	Short
2008	Chemical Wedding	Mavis	
2009	Burlesque Fairytales	Mother	
2009	Dead Man Running	Burlesque Singer	
2010	The Big I Am	Madame Dupoint	
2015	The Scorpion King 4: Quest for Power	Feminina	Video
2018	Living Among Us	Elleanor	
2020	Hypnotized	Claire	Post-production

=== Television ===
Year	Title	Role	Notes
2010	Any Human Heart	Betty	Episode: "1.3"
2011	Eric and Ernie	Lola	Television film
2011–2013	Game of Thrones	Ros	Recurring role
2014	A Christmas Mystery	Rebecca Clark	Television film
2015	Ominous	Rachel Young	Television film
2015–2020	The Magicians	Jane Chatwin	Recurring role
2017–2019	Star vs. the Forces of Evil	Queen Eclipsa	Voice, recurring role
2018	Hot Streets	Professor Lane	Voice, episode: "The Bractegon"
2018	Supergirl	Thara Ak-Var	2 episodes
