= Andrew Keegan =

American actor

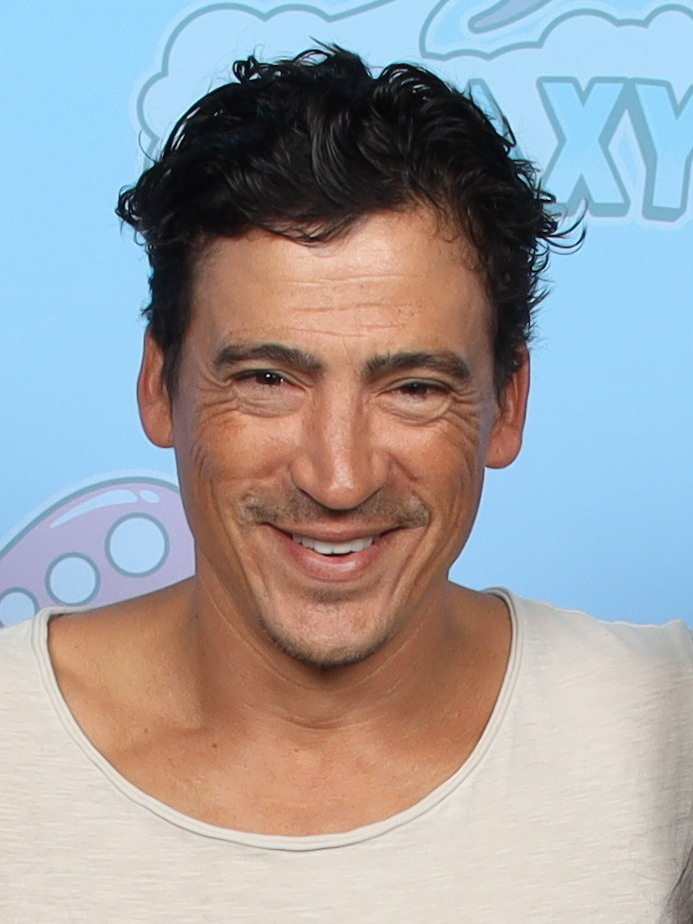
- Keegan at GalaxyCon Oklahoma City in 2024
- Born: Los Angeles, California, U.S.
- Occupations: Actor; producer; spiritual preacher
- Years active: 1993–present
- Children: 1

Andrew Keegan is an American actor. He began his career as a child actor, making his film debut with a supporting role in Camp Nowhere (1994). Keegan later received recognition for his main role as Jack Kelly on season 2 of the ABC sitcom Thunder Alley (1994–1995).

After recurring roles as Wilson West on the CW television series 7th Heaven (1997–2002) and Reed Isley on the Fox series Party of Five (1997–1998), Keegan had his breakout with a starring role in the teen romantic comedy film 10 Things I Hate About You (1999). In the 2000s, he starred in the films The Broken Hearts Club (2000), O (2001), A New Wave (2006), and Waiting for Dublin (2007), and had a recurring role as Zach on the WB series Related (2005–2006).

In the 2010s and 2020s, Keegan starred in the films Living Among Us (2018), Adverse (2020), and The Activated Man (2023), and had a supporting role in the film Love, Wedding, Marriage (2011).

== Early life ==
Keegan was born Andrew Keegan Heying in Los Angeles, California, the older son of Lana (Ocampo), a hairdresser, and Larry Heying, a voice-over actor. His mother is a Colombian immigrant and his father is from Nebraska. Keegan's paternal grandparents are of German and Czech descent. Keegan has a younger brother, Casey, who is also an actor.

== Career ==
He was first recognized for his performance in the supporting role of Zack Dell in the comedy film Camp Nowhere (1994). He then secured a recurring role in the family situation comedy Thunder Alley (1994–95). He played a love interest for Stephanie Tanner in the television series Full House for a 1995 episode. He had guest parts on numerous television shows before being cast on the TV drama Party of Five (1994). He made an appearance on Sabrina the Teenage Witch (1996) in which the episode was dedicated to his character Magic Joel.

Keegan had a bit part in the ensemble science fiction film Independence Day (1996). That same year, he landed a recurring role on 7th Heaven, where he played a single teenaged father in love with Jessica Biel's character Mary. Keegan was then cast in three modern-day Shakespearean film adaptations: as the antagonist of Heath Ledger in romantic comedy 10 Things I Hate About You (1999) (adapted from The Taming of the Shrew) and as Mekhi Phifer's best friend in O (2001), adapted from Othello, and in A Midsummer Night's Rave (2002), adapted from A Midsummer Night's Dream.

Keegan then took a role in Greg Berlanti's ensemble film The Broken Hearts Club: A Romantic Comedy (2000), which won Best Picture that year at the GLAAD Awards. He had a supporting role in the horror film Cruel World (2005) and the starring role in the independently produced comedy A New Wave (2006). In 2009, Keegan made his theatrical stage debut in the play He Asked For It, playing Rigby, a character tackling the emotional issues of being HIV-positive in modern-day society. Keegan won the lead role as Strayger, a drug-smuggling pilot in the action film Kill Speed (2010). He won another supporting role in the romantic comedy Love, Wedding, Marriage (2011).

Keegan then took on a villainous role as a sadistic and sociopathic vampire named Blake in the horror film Living Among Us (2018). He appeared in a much-praised 2020 episode of the teen drama Trinkets and had a supporting role in the crime drama Adverse (2020).

== Personal life ==
Keegan and his ex partner Arista Ilona Satterlee have a daughter, born March 2016.

=== Full Circle ===
In 2014, Keegan founded Full Circle, a community spiritual center based in Venice, Los Angeles. Vice characterized the organization as a "new religion", while other outlets called it a cult. In a 2015 interview, Keegan described the group as a "non-denominational spiritual community center where people of all beliefs and backgrounds come together to meditate, practice yoga, and engage artistically." New York Magazine reported in March 2015 that "the actual theology of the group is tough to pin down, but it seems to loosely follow Hinduism—or at least Russell Brand's Sanskrit-tattoo version of it." In May 2015, the Full Circle temple was raided by California Department of Alcoholic Beverage Control officers. The raid was apparently related to Full Circle's distribution of kombucha, a fermented beverage. A spokesperson for the temple stated that they were unaware that they needed a license to distribute kombucha. Full Circle closed in 2017 due to financial difficulties.

== Filmography ==
=== Film ===
Film
Year	Title	Role	Notes
1994	Camp Nowhere	Zack Dell	
1995	The Skateboard Kid II	Dan Foster	
1996	Independence Day	Older Boy	Uncredited
1999	10 Things I Hate About You	Joey Donner	
1999	The Contract	Howard Maple	
2000	The Broken Hearts Club: A Romantic Comedy	Kevin	Limited release
2001	O	Michael Cassio	
2002	Pandora	Phil Newfield	Short film
2002	A Midsummer Night's Rave	Xander	
2004	Perfect Opposites	Trey Reynolds	
2004	Extreme Dating	Troy Riley	
2005	Cruel World	Bobby	
2006	A New Wave	Desmond	Direct-to-video
2006	A Christmas Too Many	Matt	Direct-to-video
2007	Waiting for Dublin	Mike	
2008	Dough Boys	Sal "Sally Boy"	
2010	The Penitent Man	Ovid Serrano	
2010	Kill Speed	Strayger	Direct-to-video
2011	Sold	Clint	Short film
2011	Love, Wedding, Marriage	Jeremiah	Limited release
2012	Fight Night Legacy	Jake Rose	Short film
2013	The Price We Pay	Stone	Short film
2014	April Rain	Nick Kotov	
2014	Somebody's Mother	Frank	Short film
2016	Stars in Shorts: No Ordinary Love	Frank	
2018	Living Among Us	Blake	
2020	Adverse	Jan	
2023	The Activated Man	Kit Waller	
2025	Healing Towers	Joe Coolridge	

=== Television ===
Television
Year	Title	Role	Notes
1993	The Halloween Tree	Wally Babb (voice)	TV movie
1993–1994	Baywatch	Kenny	2 episodes S4 Ep 4 "Blindside "& S5 Ep5 "Air Buchannon"
1994–1995	Thunder Alley	Jack Kelly	17 episodes
1995	Freaky Friday	Luke	TV movie
1995	Fight for Justice: The Nancy Conn Story	Gary Conn	TV movie
1995	Full House	Ryan	Episode: "All Stood Up"
1995-1996	Step By Step	Matt Crawford	2 episodes
1996	Moesha	Matt Tarses	Season 1, Episode 10
1996	Boy Meets World	Ronnie	season 3, episode 21
1996	Sabrina, the Teenage Witch	Joel	season 1, episode 8
1997–2002	7th Heaven	Wilson West	22 episodes recurring character
1997–1998	Party of Five	Reed Isley	8 episodes
1999	The Amanda Show	Himself	season 1, episode 5
2002	Teenage Caveman	David	TV movie
2004	To Kill a Mockumentary	Spencer	Video
2005	House	Rebellious Student	Episode: "Three Stories"
2005–2006	Related	Zach	4 episodes
2010	CSI: NY	Simon	Uncredited
2012	Fight Night Legacy	Jake Rose	Episode: "Homecoming"
2012	CSI: Crime Scene Investigation	Lee Jacobs	1 episode, Season 12, Episode 19, "Split Decisions"
2013	A Dog's Life	Mozart	Voice; TV film
2014	Adam and Jamero	Stewart "Kokopelle" Martin	2 episodes
2014	Gridlocked	Adam	Episode: "Baby Time"
2017	Hollywood Darlings	Andrew	Season 1 episode 1: "How Christine Got Her Groove Back"
2020	Trinkets	Danny Truax	Season 2, Episode 7
