= Adverse (film) =

2020 American film

- Theatrical release poster
- Directed by: Brian Metcalf
- Written by: Brian Metcalf
- Produced by: Brian Metcalf; Thomas Nicholas; Kelly Arjen
- Starring: Thomas Nicholas; Lou Diamond Phillips; Sean Astin; Andrew Keegan; Jake T. Austin; Kelly Arjen; Penelope Ann Miller; Mickey Rourke
- Cinematography: Derrick Cohan
- Music by: Alex Kharlamov
- Production companies: Black Jellybeans Productions; Potato Eater Productions; Red Compass Media
- Distributed by: Lionsgate
- Release dates: February 28, 2020 (Fantasporto); January 23, 2021 (United States)
- Country: United States
- Language: English
- Box office: $15,443

Adverse is a 2020 American crime thriller film written and directed by Brian Metcalf and starring Thomas Nicholas, Lou Diamond Phillips, Sean Astin, Kelly Arjen, Penelope Ann Miller, and Mickey Rourke. It premiered at the Fantasporto Film Festival, Portugal's largest film festival, on February 28, 2020. The film earned Metcalf, a Platinum Remi Award, at the WorldFest-Houston International Film Festival.

The film was released theatrically in the United States on January 23, 2021, by Lionsgate.

== Premise ==
A rideshare driver discovers that his sister is in debt to a dangerous crime syndicate.

== Cast ==
- Thomas Nicholas as Ethan
- Lou Diamond Phillips as Dr. Cruz
- Sean Astin as Frankie
- Kelly Arjen as Mia
- Penelope Ann Miller as Nicole
- Mickey Rourke as Kaden
- Jake T. Austin as Lars
- Matt Ryan as Jake
- Andrew Keegan as Jan
- Aaron Schwartz as Detective Mitchell
- Charlene Amoia as Mary
- Jesse Garcia as Detective Ranie
- Brian Metcalf as Dante

== Production ==
Principal photography began in Los Angeles in October 2018. On January 17, 2019, it was confirmed that filming had been completed.

== Release ==
Adverse had its world premiere at FantasPorto 2020, a film festival held in Oporto, Portugal, in February 2020. The film was theatrically released in the United States on January 23, 2021, by Lionsgate.

=== Critical reception ===
Rotten Tomatoes reported that 75% of a total of 12 critics gave the film a positive review and 81% out of more than 250 viewers rated the film 3,5 stars or higher.

Variety's Joe Leydon reviewed the film calling it a "modestly diverting thriller". Vegas Film Critic, Jeff Howard, called it “an L.A. gritty crime story with lots of suspense and twists until the very end. So it’s very cool!”

MediaMikes’ Mike Gencarelli said, “Overall if you are looking for a 90 minute rollercoaster ride with a great cast throughout, I would definitely recommend watching Adverse.” Joao Pinto of Portal Cinema said that the film “delivers what it promises, that is, a thriller with action and drama” and also gave it 3.5 stars.
