= Anna Sophia Berglund =

American model

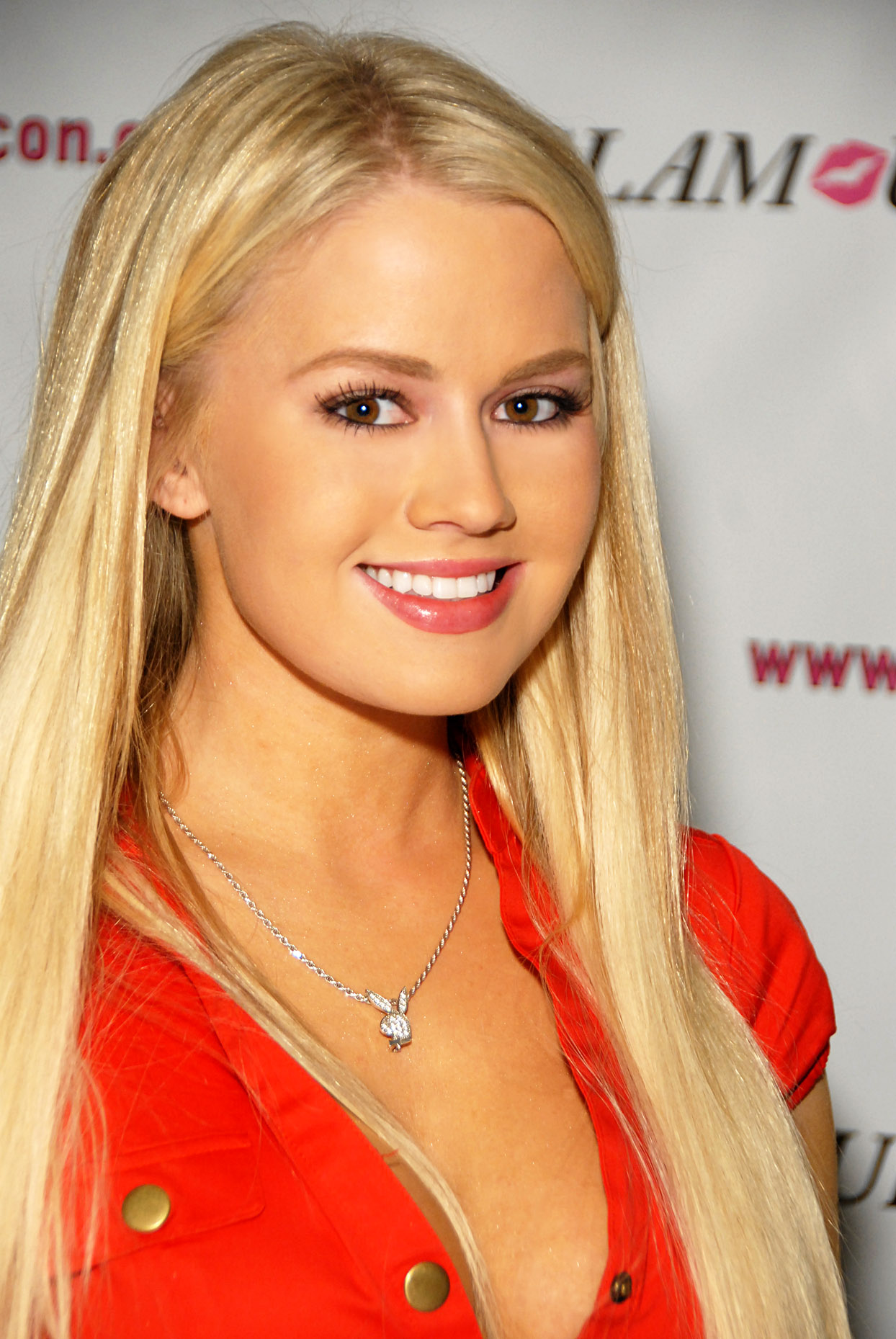
- Anna Sophia Berglund in Long Beach, California on November 5, 2011
- Occupations: Actress, model, playmate, reality show personality

Playboy centerfold appearance
- January 2011
- Preceded by: Ashley Hobbs
- Succeeded by: Kylie Johnson

Personal details
- Born: April 5, 1986 (age 39) San Pedro, Los Angeles, California, U.S.
- Height: 5 ft 6 in (1.68 m)

Signature
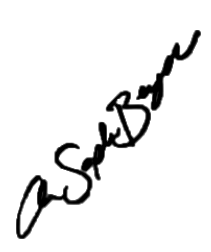

Anna Sophia Berglund (born April 5, 1986) is an American actress, model, Playmate, and reality show personality. She was Playmate of the Month for Playboy in January 2011. She was discovered originally by GXS Motorsports, where she spent two years as a promotional model. She went by the name Sophi Berglund until working for Playboy and resuming her original name.

== Biography ==
Berglund was born in San Pedro, California.

== Filmography ==
Year	Film/TV	Role
2008	Bad Mother's Handbook	Stacey
2009–10	The Girls Next Door	Herself
2012	Party Like the Queen of France	Herself
2012	Amelia's 25th	Nikkey
2012	Funny: The Documentary	Herself
2014	Space Station 76	Space Angel
2014	Dibs!	Katie
2015	Chocolate Milk Series	Katie
2015	Hot Girls Get Away with Sh*t!	Ann
2016	The Lost Tree	Claudia Tambors
2016	The Taker	Trisha
2016	Cartoon Hook-Ups	Flame Princess
2017	Cartoon Hook-Ups: The Series	Flame Princess
2017	WTF: World Thumbwrestling Federation	Roxy
2018	Living Among Us	Journey
2019	Staged Killer	Olivia

Berglund has made guest appearances in episodes of the television series Cavemen (2007), Desperate Housewives (2004) and Hannah Montana (2006), and she also had a small role in the comedy Fired Up! (2009).
