= Thomas Ian Nicholas =

American actor (born 1980)

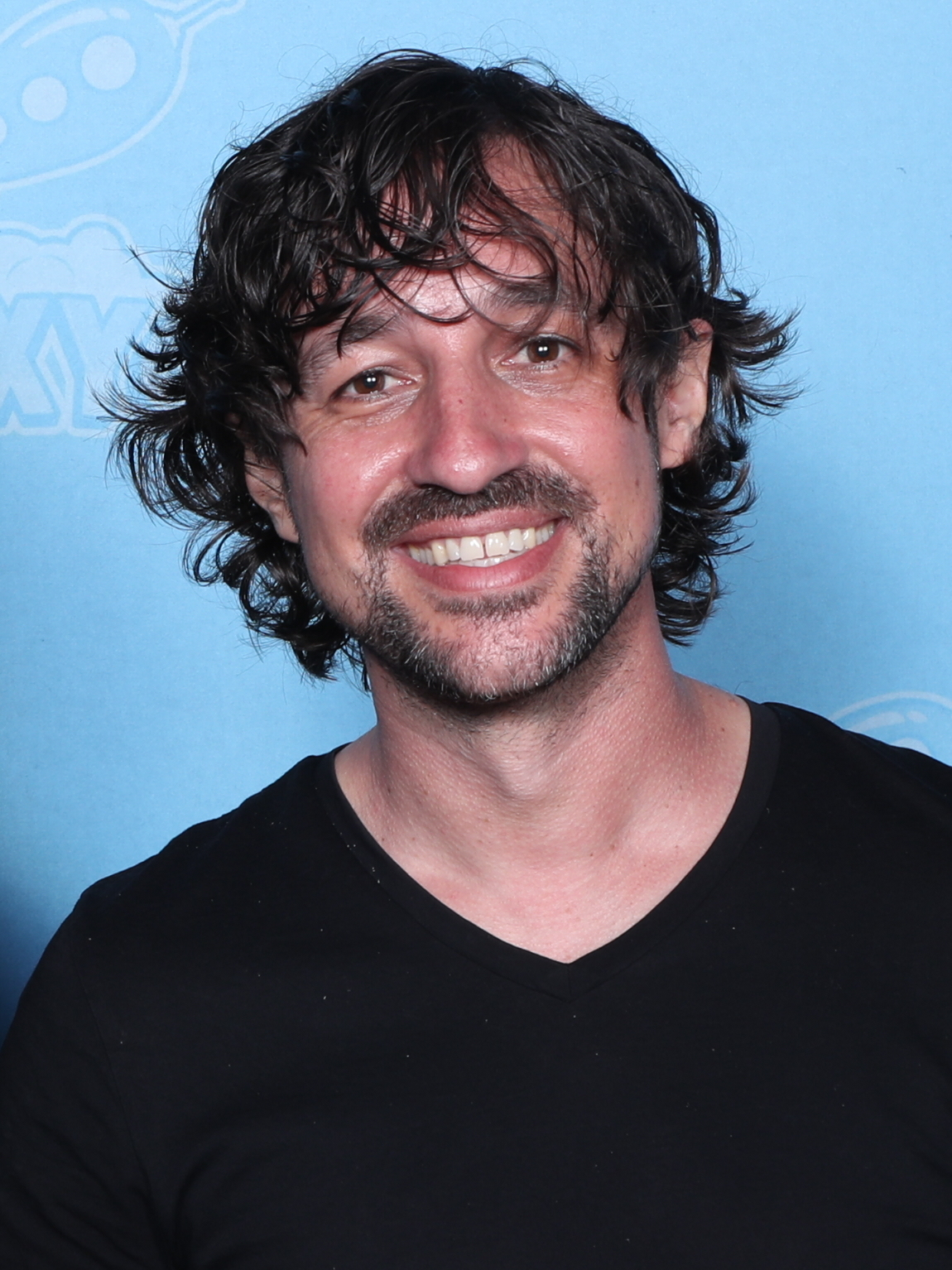
- Nicholas in 2021
- Born: July 10, 1980 (age 46); Las Vegas, Nevada, U.S.
- Occupations: Actor; musician; producer
- Years active: 1988–present
- Spouse: Colette Marino (m. 2007; sep. 2022)
- Children: 2

Thomas Ian Nicholas (born July 10, 1980) is an American actor, filmmaker and musician. The accolades he has received include an Independent Spirit Award, as well as a Young Artist Award nomination.

In film, Nicholas is best known for his lead roles as Kevin Meyers in the American Pie theatrical film series (1999–2012) and Henry Rowengartner in the sports comedy film Rookie of the Year (1993). He portrayed historic figures Frank Sinatra Jr. in Stealing Sinatra (2003) and Walt Disney in Walt Before Mickey (2015). Nicholas has also had lead roles in the films A Kid in King Arthur's Court (1995) and Adverse (2020), and supporting roles in Halloween: Resurrection (2002), The Rules of Attraction (2002), Please Give (2010), Bilal: A New Breed of Hero (2015), and Sheep and Wolves (2016).

In television, Nicholas had recurring roles on Fox shows as Todd Marsh on Party of Five (2000) and Nick Hutchison on Red Band Society (2014–2015). He had a main role as Joe on the Tubi mockumentary sitcom Underdeveloped (2023), and provided a lead voice dubbing role on the American version of the Cartoon Network animated series Gormiti Nature Unleashed (2013–2014).

== Early life ==
Nicholas was born in Las Vegas, Nevada. His mother, Marla, was a professional dancer and an acting school administrator.

== Acting career ==
Nicholas's early roles included appearances in the TV shows Who's the Boss?, Married... with Children and Dr. Quinn, Medicine Woman. He became known for his roles in the films Rookie of the Year (1993), A Kid in King Arthur's Court (1995) and American Pie (1999). He appeared in the four theatrical films of the American Pie franchise, as Kevin Myers. Nicholas had a recurring role as Todd Marsh on Party of Five (2000). He also co-starred in Halloween: Resurrection (2002), played Mitchel in the Roger Avary-directed The Rules of Attraction (2002), and played Frank Sinatra, Jr. in the Showtime movie Stealing Sinatra (2003). In 2009, he played the role of a rookie cop in the drama Life Is Hot in Cracktown. with Lara Flynn Boyle.

Nicholas played Eugene in the supporting cast of Nicole Holofcener's film Please Give (2010), which won the 2010 Independent Spirit Robert Altman Award, given to the ensemble cast. He had the role of Abbie Hoffman in the film The Chicago 8 (2011). He also appeared on an episode of ABC's Grey's Anatomy as Jeremiah. In 2015, Nicholas appeared in Walt Before Mickey, where he portrays a young Walt Disney during the struggles of his early life and career. He also played Nick Hutchison in Steven Spielberg's TV drama series Red Band Society (2014–2015), and had roles in Bilal: A New Breed of Hero (2015), and Sheep and Wolves (2016).

Nicholas is the lead actor in the Lionsgate film Adverse, opposite Mickey Rourke, Sean Astin, Lou Diamond Phillips and Penelope Ann Miller. The film was released in February 2021.

== Music career ==
Nicholas self-released his debut album, Without Warning, on January 15, 2008, and his follow-up album, "Without Warning Acoustic" on February 28, 2009. His third release was Heroes Are Human, put out on June 1, 2010. His fourth release is a self-titled EP, released March 20, 2012; the first single "My Generation" also appears as part of the American Reunion soundtrack album. His fifth release is the EP Security released on April 8, 2014.

In March 2015, Nicholas appeared on Blues Traveler's album Blow Up the Moon, co-writing the song "All the Way."

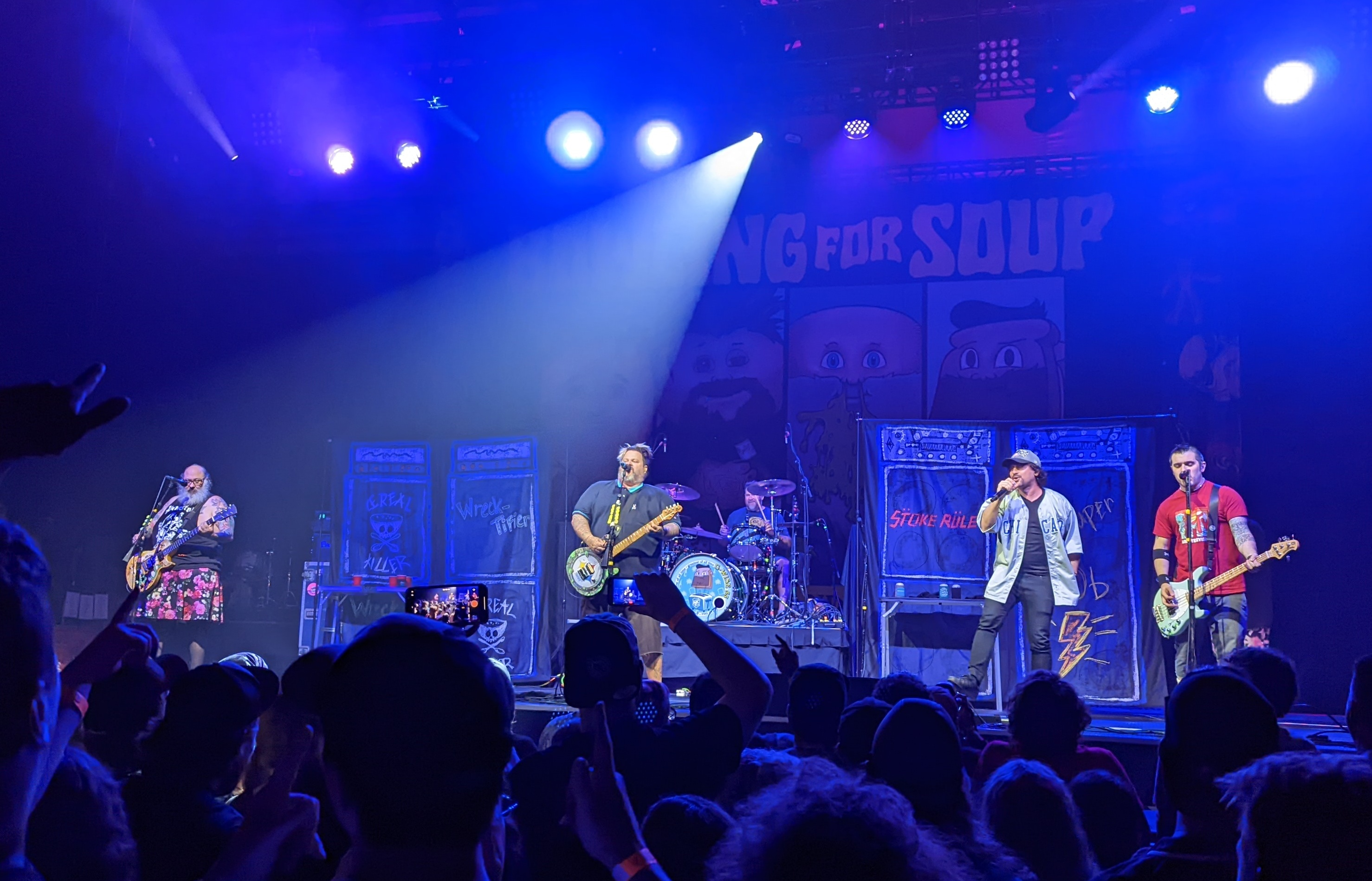
Nicholas (second from right) performing "1999" with Bowling for Soup on its release day

On July 9, 2022, Nicholas released "1999", a single that parodied the SR-71 song "1985", as popularized by Bowling for Soup.

== Personal life ==
Nicholas married Colette Marino, known as DJ Colette, in 2007. The couple had their first child, a son, in 2011. Their second child, a daughter, was born in April 2016. In May 2022, Colette filed for divorce from Nicholas.

== Filmography ==
=== Film ===
Year	Title	Role	Notes
1992	Radio Flyer	Ferdie	
1992	The Fear Inside	Sean Cole	Television film
1992	When No One Would Listen	Boy #1	Television film
1993	Rookie of the Year	Henry Rowengartner	
1995	A Kid in King Arthur's Court	Calvin Fuller	
1996	Judge and Jury	Alex Silvano	
1997	A Kid in Aladdin's Palace	Calvin Fuller	
1999	American Pie	Kevin Meyers	
2000	Cutaway	Rip	Television film
2001	American Pie 2	Kevin Meyers	
2002	Romantic Comedy 101	Igor Sullivan	Television film
2002	Halloween: Resurrection	Bill Woodlake	
2002	The Rules of Attraction	Mitchell	
2003	American Wedding	Kevin Meyers	
2003	Stealing Sinatra	Frank Sinatra Jr.	
2004	LA DJ: The Movie	Thom	Also director, writer, and producer
2005	Guy in Row Five	Bradley	
2006	National Lampoon Presents Cattle Call	Richie Rey	
2006	Cut Off	Pauly	
2008	Sherman's Way	Tom	
2008	Fading of the Cries	Michael	Also producer
2008	The Hitman	Mr. Jones	
2009	Life Is Hot in Cracktown	Chad Wesley	
2009	The Bridge to Nowhere	Eddie Stanton	
2010	Let the Game Begin	Tripp	
2010	Please Give	Eugene	
2011	The Chicago 8	Abbie Hoffman	
2011	InSight	Stephen Geiger	
2012	American Reunion	Kevin Meyers	
2012	Delivering the Goods	Steve	
2014	10 Cent Pistol	H-Wood	
2015	Walt Before Mickey	Walt Disney	
2015	Bilal: A New Breed of Hero	Saad (voice)	
2016	The Lost Tree	Noah Ericson	Also producer
2016	Sheep and Wolves	Toshchiy (voice)	English dub
2017	Bros.	Himself	
2017	Trailer Park Shark	Rob	Television film
2018	Living Among Us	Mike	Also producer
2019	Zeroville	Martin Scorsese	Credited as Thomas Nicholas
2020	Adverse	Ethan	Credited as Thomas Nicholas; Also producer
2023	Nosferatu	Blind Man	

=== Television ===
Year	Title	Role	Notes
1988	Who's the Boss?	Little Tony Micelli	Episode: "Yankee-Doodle Micelli"; Credited as Thomas Nicholas
1989	Baywatch	Ricky Blount	Episode: "Heat Wave"
1989	Married... with Children	Bobby	2 episodes
1990	Santa Barbara	Young Steven Slade	
1991	Harry and the Hendersons	Scootch	Episode: "The Bodyguard"
1991	Sisters	Jason	Episode: "The Kindness of Stranglers"
1992	Julie	Boy #1	Episode: "A Delicate Balance"
1993, 1995	Dr. Quinn, Medicine Woman	Richard	2 episodes
1997	The Tony Danza Show	Brandon	Episode: "With Your Guest Host Tony DiMeo"; Uncredited
1998	Honey, I Shrunk the Kids: The TV Show	Damon	Episode: "Honey, I'm in the Mood for Love"
1999	Chicken Soup for the Soul	Steve	Episode: "Crying's Okay"
2000	Twice in a Lifetime	Sam Ryder/Jordan Curtis/Kirk Ivers	Episode: "Fathers and Sons"
2000	Party of Five	Todd Marsh	8 episodes
2005	Medium	Greg Watt	Episode: "Jump Start"
2005	Grey's Anatomy	Jeremiah Tate	Episode: "Deny, Deny, Deny"
2013–2014	Gormiti Nature Unleashed	Kondo/Deron/Nimbyth (voice role; English dub)	Main cast; 26 episodes
2014–2015	Red Band Society	Nick Hutchison	6 episodes
2016	Hell's Kitchen	Himself	Episode: "12 Chefs Compete"
2023	Underdeveloped	Joe	Main role; 6 episodes Also executive producer

=== Music videos ===
Year	Band/Song	Role	Notes
2012	Mallory Knox – "Wake Up"	Lead male	
2015	MC Yankoo – "Drunk in Bangkok"	Guest star	
2015	Plain White T's – "Pause"	Guest star	
2023	Bring Me the Horizon – "Lost"	Doctor	
2024	Ice Nine Kills – "A Work of Art"	Felchman	

=== Awards and nominations ===
Year	Award	Category	Nominated work	Result
1995	YoungStar Awards	Best Performance by a Young Actor in a Comedy Film	A Kid in King Arthur's Court	Nominated
1996	Young Artist Awards	Best Young Supporting Actor – Feature Film	A Kid in King Arthur's Court	Nominated
2000	Young Hollywood Awards	Best Ensemble Cast	American Pie	Won
2010	Gotham Awards	Best Ensemble Performance	Please Give	Nominated
2011	Independent Spirit Awards	Robert Altman Award	Please Give	Won
2016	Telly Awards	Film/Video – Non-Broadcast Productions – Directing	The Lost Tree	Won
2016	Davey Awards	Film/Video – Entertainment	The Lost Tree	Won
2017	Riverside International Film Festival	Best Thriller	The Lost Tree	Won
2017	Independent Filmmakers Showcase	Best Picture	The Lost Tree	Nominated
2017	Independent Filmmakers Showcase	Audience Award – Best Feature	The Lost Tree	Nominated
2017	North Hollywood Cinefest	Best Picture	The Lost Tree	Nominated
2017	Communicator Awards	Film/Video/Television	The Lost Tree	Won
2020	WorldFest Houston	Best Actor	Adverse	Nominated
2020	Videographer Awards	Entertainment	Adverse	Won
2020	Accolade Competition	Award of Excellence Special Mention – Feature Film	Adverse	Won
2020	Davey Awards	Film/Video – Entertainment	Adverse	Won
2020	W3 Awards	Entertainment	Adverse	Won
2020	Cinefantasy International Fantastic Cinema Festival	Best Film	Adverse	Nominated
2021	Telly Awards	Non-Broadcast – Entertainment	Adverse	Won
2021	Communicator Awards	Film/Video/Television	Adverse	Won

== Discography ==
=== Studio albums ===
Title	Details
Without Warning	Released: January 15, 2008; Label: Self-released; Format: LP, CD, digital download
Heroes are Human	Released: June 1, 2010; Label: Self-released; Format: LP, CD, digital download
Security	Released: April 20, 2015; Label: Self-released; Format: LP, CD, digital download
We're Gonna Be Okay	Released: May 17, 2024; Label: Self-released; Format: LP, CD, digital download

=== Compilation albums ===
Title	Details
Frat Party	Released: February 3, 2017; Label: Self-released; Format: LP, CD, digital download

=== Extended plays ===
Title	Details
Tnb	Released: March 20, 2012; Label: Self-released; Format: Digital download, streaming
Security	Released: April 8, 2014; Label: Self-released; Format: Digital download, streaming
