= 25 Year Celebration of Mannheim Steamroller =

Compilation album by Mannheim Steamroller
- Released: 1999
- Recorded: 1974–99
- Genre: New-age
- Length: 1:28:57
- Label: American Gramaphone

Mannheim Steamroller chronology
Mannheim Steamroller Meets the Mouse (1999)	25 Year Celebration of Mannheim Steamroller (1999)	Fresh Aire 8 (2000)

25 Year Celebration of Mannheim Steamroller is a two-disc anthology album released by new-age musical group Mannheim Steamroller in 1999, in honor of the group's 25th anniversary.

== Track listing ==
All tracks are written by Chip Davis.

Disc 1
No.	Title	From the album:	Length
1.	"The Steamroller"	Fresh Aire 8	4:38
2.	"Morning"	Fresh Aire III	2:56
3.	"Baroque-A-Nova" (with Mason Williams)	Classical Gas	3:07
4.	"Christmas Lullaby"	Christmas in the Aire	4:06
5.	"Four Rows of Jacks"	Fresh Aire IV	3:13
6.	"Chocolate Coffee"	Sunday Morning Coffee II	3:54
7.	"A Winter's Day"	Impressions	5:11
8.	"Morning Blend"	Sunday Morning Coffee	5:17
9.	"Interlude I"	Fresh Aire Interludes	2:43
10.	"Reggae Mañana Mon"	Party	2:12
11.	"Prelude / Chocolate Fudge"	Fresh Aire	4:28
12.	"Slo Dancin' in the Living Room"	Romance II	3:50

Disc 2
No.	Title	From the album:	Length
13.	"The Pines of Rome"	Yellowstone: The Music of Nature	2:58
14.	"Twilight at Rhodes"	Fresh Aire VI	1:59
15.	"Zip-A-Dee-Doo-Dah"	Mannheim Steamroller Meets the Mouse	3:19
16.	"The 7 Metals of Alchemy"	Fresh Aire 7	3:24
17.	"Dancin' in the Stars"	Fresh Aire V	5:13
18.	"Wassail, Wassail"	Mannheim Steamroller Christmas	2:22
19.	"The Fourth Door"	Fresh Aire II	3:53
20.	"Sonata Bach's Lunch"	Dinner	2:54
21.	"The Holly & The Ivy"	A Fresh Aire Christmas	3:01
22.	"Eclectic Blue"	Party 2	3:20
23.	"Harp Seals"	Saving the Wildlife	1:38
24.	"Kanbai"	Romance	4:08
25.	"Ruslan and Ludmilla"	To Russia with Love	5:13
Total length:			1:28:57

== Personnel ==
- Chip Davis – Symphonic Conductor, Concept By, Composed By
- John Rutter – Choral Conductor
- Art Direction by Hirsch Design
- Artwork by Gilbert Williams, Greg Manchess
- Additional Composition by Allan Blye, Mason Williams, Michael Glinka, Ottorine Respighi
- Concertmaster – Arnie Roth, Ashley Arbuckle, Mike Davis, Ruben Gonzalez, Steve Shipps
