= Billboard Top Christmas Albums of the 1990s =

The Top Christmas Albums (renamed Top Holiday Albums in 2000) is published weekly by Billboard during the holiday season of each year tracking the best-selling Christmas albums in the United States.

== Number-one Top Christmas Albums of the 1990s ==
The following are the albums that reached the Number one position on the Top Christmas Album Charts before it was renamed Top Holiday Albums on November 25, 2000.

Issue date	Title	Artist	Ref.
December 22, 1990	Because It's Christmas	Barry Manilow	
January 5, 1991	Because It's Christmas	Barry Manilow	
December 7, 1991	A Fresh Aire Christmas	Mannheim Steamroller	
December 14, 1991	Mannheim Steamroller Christmas	Mannheim Steamroller	
December 21, 1991	A Fresh Aire Christmas	Mannheim Steamroller	
December 28, 1991	A Fresh Aire Christmas	Mannheim Steamroller	
January 4, 1992	A Fresh Aire Christmas	Mannheim Steamroller	
November 28, 1992	Beyond The Season	Garth Brooks	
December 5, 1992	Beyond The Season	Garth Brooks	
December 12, 1992	Home For Christmas	Amy Grant	
December 19, 1992	Home For Christmas	Amy Grant	
December 26, 1992	Home For Christmas	Amy Grant	
January 2, 1993	Home For Christmas	Amy Grant	
January 9, 1993	Home For Christmas	Amy Grant	
December 4, 1993	Let There Be Peace On Earth	Vince Gill	
December 11, 1993	Let There Be Peace On Earth	Vince Gill	
December 18, 1993	Let There Be Peace On Earth	Vince Gill	
December 25, 1993	When My Heart Finds Christmas	Harry Connick, Jr.	
January 1, 1994	When My Heart Finds Christmas	Harry Connick, Jr.	
January 8, 1994	When My Heart Finds Christmas	Harry Connick, Jr.	
November 26, 1994	Merry Christmas	Mariah Carey	
December 3, 1994	Miracles: The Holiday Album	Kenny G	
December 10, 1994	Miracles: The Holiday Album	Kenny G	
December 17, 1994	Miracles: The Holiday Album	Kenny G	
December 24, 1994	Miracles: The Holiday Album	Kenny G	
December 31, 1994	Miracles: The Holiday Album	Kenny G	
January 7, 1995	Miracles: The Holiday Album	Kenny G	
November 25, 1995	Christmas in the Aire	Mannheim Steamroller	
December 2, 1995	Christmas in the Aire	Mannheim Steamroller	
December 9, 1995	Christmas in the Aire	Mannheim Steamroller	
December 16, 1995	Christmas in the Aire	Mannheim Steamroller	
December 23, 1995	Miracles: The Holiday Album	Kenny G	
December 30, 1995	Miracles: The Holiday Album	Kenny G	
January 6, 1996	Christmas In The Aire	Mannheim Steamroller	
November 16, 1996	Miracles: The Holiday Album	Kenny G	
November 23, 1996	Miracles: The Holiday Album	Kenny G	
November 30, 1996	Miracles: The Holiday Album	Kenny G	
December 7, 1996	Miracles: The Holiday Album	Kenny G	
December 14, 1996	Miracles: The Holiday Album	Kenny G	
December 21, 1996	Miracles: The Holiday Album	Kenny G	
December 28, 1996	Miracles: The Holiday Album	Kenny G	
January 4, 1997	Miracles: The Holiday Album	Kenny G	
January 11, 1997	Miracles: The Holiday Album	Kenny G	
November 22, 1997	Christmas Live	Mannheim Steamroller	
November 29, 1997	Christmas Live	Mannheim Steamroller	
December 6, 1997	Snowed In	Hanson	
December 13, 1997	Snowed In	Hanson	
December 20, 1997	Snowed In	Hanson	
December 27, 1997	Snowed In	Hanson	
January 3, 1998	Snowed In	Hanson	
January 10, 1998	Snowed In	Hanson	
November 21, 1998	These Are Special Times	Celine Dion	
November 28, 1998	These Are Special Times	Celine Dion	
December 5, 1998	These Are Special Times	Celine Dion	
December 12, 1998	These Are Special Times	Celine Dion	
December 19, 1998	These Are Special Times	Celine Dion	
December 26, 1998	These Are Special Times	Celine Dion	
January 2, 1999	These Are Special Times	Celine Dion	
January 9, 1999	These Are Special Times	Celine Dion	
January 16, 1999	These Are Special Times	Celine Dion	
January 23, 1999	Home For Christmas	N Sync	
November 20, 1999	A Rosie Christmas	Rosie O'Donnell	
November 27, 1999	A Rosie Christmas	Rosie O'Donnell	
December 4, 1999	Faith: A Holiday Album	Kenny G	
December 11, 1999	Garth Brooks & the Magic of Christmas	Garth Brooks	
December 18, 1999	Garth Brooks & the Magic of Christmas	Garth Brooks	
December 25, 1999	Faith: A Holiday Album	Kenny G	
January 1, 2000	Faith: A Holiday Album	Kenny G	
January 8, 2000	Faith: A Holiday Album	Kenny G	
January 15, 2000	Faith: A Holiday Album	Kenny G	

== The 50 Top Christmas Albums of the 90s ==
These are the top 50 albums that charted The Top Christmas Albums survey. The chart was renamed Top Holiday Albums at the beginning of the 2000 holiday season. The peak position reflects the highest position the album charted between December 22, 1990, until January 15, 2000, but the top 10 and total weeks include the total weeks charted since the first Christmas Records chart in 1958, all the Christmas album surveys from November 30, 1963, until December 22, 1973 and the weeks charted on the Christmas Hits survey from December 17, 1983, until January 6, 1990. Many of the albums continued to chart on the Top Holiday Albums chart. (Note: 'Billboard's online Top Holiday Album chart history only goes back to the December 21, 1985 Christmas Hits chart. Most of the survey weeks of the Top Christmas Album charts were not available in print. Only the data for the #1 positions are listed online for the weeks of November 28, 1992, December 5, 1992, November 26, 1994 and November 22, 1997.)

Rank	Album	Artist	Year Rlsd.	Peak Date	Peak Pos.	Weeks		
Rank	Album	Artist	Year Rlsd.	Peak Date	Peak Pos.	Peak	Top 10	Chart
1	Miracles: The Holiday Album	Kenny G	1994	12/3/1994	#1	17	43	50
2	These Are Special Times	Celine Dion	1998	11/21/1998	#1	9	19	19
3	Snowed In	Hanson	1997	12/6/1997	#1	6	6	16
4	Christmas in the Aire	Mannheim Steamroller	1995	11/25/1995	#1	5	30	41
5	Home for Christmas	Amy Grant	1992	12/12/1992	#1	5	24	52
6	Faith: A Holiday Album	Kenny G	1999	12/4/1999	#1	5	7	7
7	A Fresh Aire Christmas	Mannheim Steamroller	1988	12/7/1991	#1	4 (Note: Mannheim Steamroller's A Fresh Aire Christmas peaked at #1 for 2 additional weeks during the 1980s on the Christmas Hits chart starting 12/24/1988.)	52	73
8	When My Heart Finds Christmas	Harry Connick Jr.	1993	12/25/1993	#1	3	34	53
9	Let There Be Peace On Earth	Vince Gill	1993	12/4/1993	#1	3	17	42
10	A Rosie Christmas	Rosie O'Donnell	1999	11/20/1999	#1	2	9	9
11	Beyond The Season	Garth Brooks	1992	11/28/1992	#1	2	9	9
12	Christmas Live	Mannheim Steamroller	1997	11/22/1997	#1	2	8	17
13	Garth Brooks & the Magic of Christmas	Garth Brooks	1999	12/11/1999	#1	2	6	6
14	Because It's Christmas	Barry Manilow	1990	12/22/1990	#1	2	4	8
15	Mannheim Steamroller Christmas	Mannheim Steamroller	1984	12/14/1991	#1	1	53	81
16	Merry Christmas	Mariah Carey	1994	11/26/1994	#1	1	35	49
17	Home For Christmas	N Sync	1998	1/23/1999	#1	1	18	18
18	A Very Special Christmas 2	Various Artists	1992	12/12/1992	#2	5	15	41
19	Christmas Interpretations	Boyz II Men	1993	12/11/1993	#2	2	20	37
20	A Very Special Christmas (Note: A Very Special Christmas peaked at #1 on the Christmas Hits chart 12/12/1987.)	Various Artists	1987	1/4/1992	#2	1	30	70
21	A Very Special Christmas 3	Various Artists	1997	11/29/1997	#2	1	10	20
22	The Christmas Angel: A Family Story	Mannheim Steamroller	1998	11/21/1998	#2	1	10	19
23	This Is the Time: The Christmas Album	Michael Bolton	1996	11/30/1996	#2	1	9	18
24	This Christmas	98 Degrees	1999	11/20/1999	#2	1	9	9
25	The Gift	Jim Brickman	1997	11/22/1997	#2	1	8	20
26	Joy: A Holiday Collection	Jewel	1999	11/27/1999	#2	1	8	9
27	The Christmas Album	Neil Diamond	1992	12/19/1992	#3	3	13	39
28	Breath of Heaven: A Christmas Collection	Vince Gill with Patrick Williams and his Orchestra	1998	11/21/1998	#3	1	9	19
29	A Christmas to Remember	Amy Grant	1999	12/4/1999	#3	1	9	9
30	A Romantic Christmas	John Tesh	1992	11/25/1995	#3	1	7	21
31	Disney's Christmas Collection	Walt Disney Records	1995	1/16/1999	#3	1	4	24
32	The Christmas Song (Note: Nat "King" Cole's The Christmas Song peaked at #2 on the Best Bets For Christmas 12/13/1969.)	Nat King Cole	1960	12/7/1991	#4	5	56	112
33	This Is Christmas	Luther Vandross	1995	12/16/1995	#4	4	6	21
34	Chicago 25	Chicago	1998	12/12/1998	#4	3	6	17
35	Christmas Island	Jimmy Buffett	1996	12/7/1996	#4	2	7	24
36	Merry, Merry Christmas (Note: New Kids On The Block's Merry, Merry Christmas peaked at #1 on the Christmas Hits chart 12/23/1989.)	New Kids On The Block	1989	12/22/1990	#4	2	2	4
37	A Christmas Story	Point Of Grace	1999	12/11/1999	#4	1	7	9
38	Christmastime	Michael W. Smith	1998	11/21/1998	#4	1	6	16
39	Honky Tonk Christmas	Alan Jackson	1998	12/12/1998	#4	1	3	19
40	Bethlehem	Brian McKnight	1998	1/23/1999	#4	1	2	11
41	A Family Christmas	John Tesh	1999	12/11/1999	#4	1	1	8
42	Christmas Portrait (Note: The Carpenter's Christmas Portrait peaked at #2 on the Christmas Hits chart 12/15/1984.)	The Carpenters	1978	12/21/1991	#5	3	18	65
43	December (Note: George Winston's December peaked at #2 on the Christmas Hits chart 12/15/1984.)	George Winston	1982	12/7/1991	#5	1	19	43
44	Star Bright	Vannessa Williams	1996	1/11/1997	#5	1	8	23
45	A Christmas Album	Amy Grant	1983	12/14/1991	#5	1	7	23
46	Superstar Christmas	Various Artists	1997	11/21/1998	#5	1	7	18
47	A Contemporary Gospel Christmas	Various artists	1994	12/7/1996	#5	1	4	13
48	A Very Veggie Christmas	Veggie Tales	1996	1/23/1999	#5	1	1	11
49	A Christmas Album (Note: Barbra Streisand's A Christmas Album peaked at #1 on the Best Bets For Christmas 12/2/1967.)	Barbra Streisand	1967	12/21/1991	#6	3	38	96
50	Christmas Eve and Other Stories	Trans-Siberian Orchestra	1996	12/27/1997	#6	3	4	20

== See also ==
- Billboard Christmas Hits 1983-1989
- Billboard Christmas Holiday Charts
- List of best-selling Christmas albums in the United States
- List of Billboard Top Holiday Albums number ones of the 2000s
