= American Spirit (album) =

Studio album by C. W. McCall and Mannheim Steamroller
- Released: May 20, 2003
- Genre: Country
- Length: 54:36
- Label: American Gramaphone
- Producer: Chip Davis

Mannheim Steamroller chronology
Christmas Extraordinaire (2001)	American Spirit (2003)	Halloween (2003)

Professional ratings
Review scores
Source	Rating
Allmusic	2/5 stars

American Spirit is an album released on American Gramaphone in 2003 (see 2003 in music) as a collaboration between Mannheim Steamroller and country musician C. W. McCall. The album focuses on American patriotic songs, hence the title. McCall contributed to a number of spoken word songs on the album and rerecorded his 1976 hit song "Convoy" for it; this was also the case with another song of his, "Wolf Creek Pass," which can be found on the album. McCall is a persona created by Bill Fries and Mannheim Steamroller leader Chip Davis; Fries provides the vocals as McCall. This was the last album to feature C. W. McCall.

== Track listing ==
No.	Title	Writer(s)	Length
1.	"Star Spangled Banner"	Francis Scott Key, John Stafford Smith	2:41
2.	"American Spirit"	Bill Fries, Chip Davis	2:38
3.	"America the Beautiful"	Katharine Lee Bates, Samuel A. Ward	3:44
4.	"Convoy"	Fries, Davis	3:53
5.	"Fanfare for the Common Man"	Aaron Copland	3:48
6.	"Yellowstone Morning"	Davis	2:53
7.	"Heritage"	Davis	4:40
8.	"Wolf Creek Pass"	Fries, Davis	4:02
9.	"Home on the Range"	Brewster Higley, Daniel Kelly	4:18
10.	"Mt. McKinley"	Davis	2:54
11.	"Cloudburst"	Ferde Grofe	9:31
12.	"Tin Type"	Fries, Davis	4:49
13.	"Battle Hymn of the Republic"	Julia Ward Howe	4:45
Total length:			54:36

== Personnel ==
- C. W. McCall - Vocals
- Chip Davis - Percussion, Drums & Toys, Conductor, Producer
- Jackson Berkey - Keyboards
- Ron Cooley - Bass guitar & All Fretted Instruments
- Arnie Roth - Violin Solos, Concertmaster
- Bobby Jenkins - Oboe Solos
- Members of the Chicago Symphony Chorus
- Duain Wolfe - Chorus Director and Conductor
- Dale Clevenger, Oto Carrillo, Greg Flint, Melanie Cottle - Horn
- John Hagstrom, Tage Larson, Mark Ridenour - Trumpet
- Ward Stare, Adam Moen - Tenor Trombone
- Charles Vernon - Bass Trombone
- Charlie Suchat - Tuba
- Doug Waddell - Timpani
- Ted Atkatz, Mike Folker - Percussion

=== Additional personnel ===
- Chris Sabold, Mike Konopka, Dick Lewsey - Engineers
- Mat Lejeune, Brian Pinke, Mike Scasiwicz, Darren Styles - Assistant Engineers
- Metro Mobile - Recording
