= Trimming the Tree =

Compilation album by Mannheim Steamroller
- Released: 2007
- Recorded: 2007
- Genre: Christmas, symphonic pop
- Length: 32:50
- Label: American Gramaphone
- Producer: Chip Davis

Mannheim Steamroller chronology
Christmas Song (2005)	Trimming the Tree (2007)	Christmasville (2008)

Trimming the Tree is a Mannheim Steamroller album of Christmas music, released in 2007. It is a compilation album, having copyrights listed as 2001, 2002, 2005 and 2007. Although released by Chip Davis' American Gramaphone label, the album was available exclusively through Lowe's, a major home-improvement retailer in the United States It was packaged in shrink wrap (but in separate jewel cases) as a two-disc set, along with Christmas Extraordinaire. It is the third such compilation (after 2005 and 2006) in the Lowe's series, the fourth was Morning Frost in 2008.

== Track listing ==
No.	Title	Writer(s)	Length
1.	"O Little Town of Bethlehem"	Phillips Brooks / Lewis Redner	3:57
2.	"Joy to the World"	Isaac Watts	3:40
3.	"Lo How a Rose E'er Blooming" (Traditional)		2:26
4.	"In dulci jubilo" (Traditional)		2:48
5.	"The First Noel" (Traditional)		3:39
6.	"The Holly and the Ivy" (Traditional)		3:04
7.	"Coventry Carol" (Traditional)		2:44
8.	"Rudolph the Red-Nosed Reindeer"	Johnny Marks	3:16
9.	"Los Peces en el Rio" (Traditional)		3:52
10.	"Away in a Manger" (Traditional)		3:24
Total length:			32:50
