= Visual Musik =

Visual Musik was a record label based in Omaha, Nebraska. It specialized in new age music. It was founded in 1987 by Carol Davis, ex-wife of Chip Davis of Mannheim Steamroller fame. Carol Davis had previously contributed photography and visuals to several early Mannheim Steamroller albums in the Fresh Aire series, as well as other albums released under Chip Davis' American Gramaphone label.

== Releases ==
=== Albums ===
- Sounds That Move Air (compilation, 1987)
- Earth City Expressway (compilation, 1988)
- Ric Swanson -- Christmas In Other Places (1988)
- Doug Markley / The Markley Band -- Philly Fillet (1989)
- Scott Duncan -- Contemporary Salon (1989)
- Zurich -- Incommunicado (1989)
- Lars Ericson and Tom Ware -- The Big Bang (1990)

=== Video ===
- Hypnotic Places, Exotic Spaces (1987)
