= Christmas Symphony II =

Studio album by Mannheim Steamroller
- Released: October 2013
- Recorded: 1984, 1988, 1995, and 2001, and orchestra overdubs in 2013
- Genre: Christmas
- Length: 48:38
- Label: American Gramaphone
- Producer: Chip Davis, Arnie Roth

Christmas Symphony II is an album by Mannheim Steamroller, featuring the Czech Philharmonic. It was released in October 2013 only through Target.

== Track listing ==
No.	Title	Writer(s)	Length
1.	"Carol of the Bells"	Mykola Leontovych	3:56
2.	"Veni Veni (O Come, O Come, Emmanuel)"	Traditional	4:21
3.	"Away in a Manger"	James Ramsey Murray	3:25
4.	"Joy to the World"	George Frideric Handel	3:42
5.	"Christmas Lullaby"	Chip Davis	4:07
6.	"Hallelujah"	Handel	4:33
7.	"Do You Hear What I Hear?"	Gloria Shayne	4:07
8.	"Lo How A Rose E'er Blooming"	Traditional	2:26
9.	"Traditions of Christmas"	Davis	3:38
10.	"Good King Wenceslas"	Traditional	3:34
11.	"We Three Kings"	John Hopkins	4:01
12.	"Patapan / Fum, Fum, Fum Medley"	Bernard de la Monnoye / Traditional	2:46
13.	"Auld Lang Syne"	Robert Burns	3:42
Total length:			48:38

== Personnel ==
- Chip Davis - Arranger, Composer, Cover Design, Creation, Drums, Executive Producer, Liner Notes, Main Personnel, Programming, Recorder
- Arnie Roth - Conductor, Orchestral Arrangements, Producer
- Brian Ackley - Mixing
- Cambridge Singers - Featured Artist
- Ron Cooley - Acoustic guitar, Lute
- Cenda Kotzmann - Assistant Engineer
- Chris Szuberla - Programming
- Czech Philharmonic Orchestra - Featured Artist
- Dave Cwirko - Mastering
- Eric Roth - Associate Producer, Orchestral Arrangements, Programming
- Jackson Berkey - Harpsichord, Piano
- Jeff Handley - Percussion, Timpani
- Jerry Blackstone - Director
- John Rutter - Director
- Mat Prock - Programming, Engineer
- Michael Hradisky - Assistant Engineer
- Michael Keefe - Harpsichord, Piano
- Petr Pycha - Contractor, Recording Manager
- Roxanne Layton - Recorder
- Tom Sharpe - Drums
- University of Michigan Men's Glee Club - Featured Artist
