= Fresh Aire IV =

Fresh Aire 4

Studio album by Mannheim Steamroller
- Released: December 15, 1981
- Recorded: 1981
- Genre: New age, Christmas music
- Length: 33:38
- Label: American Gramaphone
- Producer: Chip Davis and Don Sears

Mannheim Steamroller chronology
Fresh Aire III (1979)	Fresh Aire 4 (1981)	Fresh Aire V (1983)

Professional ratings
Review scores
Source	Rating
Allmusic	4/5 stars

Fresh Aire 4 is the fourth album in new age musical group Mannheim Steamroller's Fresh Aire series. The album was originally released in 1981. Each of the first four Fresh Aire albums is based on a season; Fresh Aire 4's theme is Winter. The entire album was mixed and recorded digitally and was also one of the first CDs released.

"Red Wine," a re-arrangement of the traditional folk song, "Greensleeves", is a sign of the group's successful Christmas albums to come. The track "Embers" is a slower, reflective reworking of the spritely "Saras Band" from the first Fresh Aire.

== Track listing ==
All tracks are written by Chip Davis, except where noted.

No.	Title	Writer(s)	Length
1.	"G Major Toccata"		5:06
2.	"Crystal"		4:21
3.	"Interlude 7"		3:04
4.	"Four Rows of Jacks"		3:13
5.	"Red Wine"	traditional	4:20
6.	"Dancing Flames"		6:56
7.	"The Dream"		3:11
8.	"Embers"		3:22
Total length:			33:00

== Personnel ==
- Chip Davis – drums, percussion, recorders, synthesizer
- Jackson Berkey – Davis harpsichord, Baldwin SD-10 piano, Yamaha electric grand, celeste, pipe organ (109 rank Aeolian-Skinner), Fender Rhodes, synthesizer
- Eric Hansen – lute, bass guitar
- Steve Shipps, Hugh Brown, Dorothy Brown, Joe Landes, Merton Shatzkin, James Hammond, Sue Robinson, Mort Alpert, Chris Farber, Lou Newman, Miriam Duffelmeyer, Beth McCollum, Charles W. Cronkhite – strings
- Bob Jenkins – oboe
- John Boden – French horn
