= Fresh Aire 7 =

Studio album by Mannheim Steamroller
- Released: November 7, 1990
- Recorded: 1990
- Genre: New age
- Length: 45:19
- Label: American Gramaphone
- Producer: Chip Davis

Mannheim Steamroller chronology
Yellowstone: The Music of Nature (1989)	Fresh Aire 7 (1990)	To Russia with Love (1994)

Professional ratings
Review scores
Source	Rating
Allmusic	4.5/5 stars

Fresh Aire 7 was the seventh album in new age musical group Mannheim Steamroller's Fresh Aire series. The album was originally released in 1990 and peaked at #77 on the Billboard album chart in December of that year. Its theme is based on the number seven. The album won a Grammy Award for best New Age album in 1991.

== Track listing ==
All tracks are written by Chip Davis.

No.	Title	Length
1.	"Conjuring the Number 7"	4:02
2.	"Sunday the 7th Day"	3:52
3.	"The 7 Colours of the Rainbow"	5:31
4.	"The 7 C's"	0:25
5.	"The 7 Metals of Alchemy"	3:26

The 7 Chakras Of The Body
No.	Title	Length
6.	"Chakra 1"	1:16
7.	"Chakra 2"	4:16
8.	"Chakra 3"	3:21
9.	"Chakra 4"	5:31
10.	"Chakra 5"	4:24
11.	"Chakra 6"	3:40
12.	"Chakra 7"	3:56
13.	"The 7 Stars of the Big Dipper"	3:02
Total length:		48:21

== Personnel ==
- Chip Davis - Electric Piano (20th Century Digital Upright), Conductor, Producer, Liner notes
- Jackson Berkey - Harpsichord
- John Boyd - Sound engineer, Mixed by, Mastered by
- The Cambridge Singers - Choir
- Louis Davis Sr. - Orchestral Assistance
- Louis Davis Jr. - Technician (Keyboard)
- Stephen Hartman - Harp
- Bobby Jenkins - Oboe, English Horn
- Arnie Roth - Concertmaster, Contractor, Violin
- John Rutter - Chorus Master
- Bass guitar – Brad Opland, Collins Trier, Gregory Sarcher
- Cello – Gary Stucka, Kim Scholes, John Sharp, Leonard Chausow, Victoria Mayne, Walter Preucil
- French Horn – Alice Render-Clevenger, Dale Clevenger, James Smelser, Mary Gingrich
- Viola – Martin Abrams, Catherine Brubaker, Li-Kuo Chang, Roger Moulton, Daniel Strba, Robert Swan
- Violin – Fox Fehling, Adrian Gola, Joseph Golan, Lawrence Golan, Blair Milton, Everett Mirsky, Florentina Ramniceanu, Gail Salvatori, Laura Miller, Liba Schacht, Marlou Johnston, Otakar Sroubek, Peter Labella, Samuel Magad, Thomas Yang
- Alto Vocals – Frances Jellard, Mary Hitch, Nicolas Barber, Peter Gritton, Phyllida Hancock, Susanna Spicer
- Bass Vocals – Andrew Hammond, Charles Gibbs, Charles Pott, Don Greig, James Ottaway, Mike Chambers, Patrick Lee-Browne
- Soprano Vocals – Alison Smart, Caroline Ashton, Clare Wallace, Donna Deam, Jo Maggs, Jocelyn Miles, Karen Kerslake, Penny Stow, Rachel Platt, Simone Mace
- Tenor Vocals – Andrew Gant, Angus Smith, Harvey Brough, Jeremy Taylor, Mark le Brocq, Paul Gordon
