= Christmas Symphony (Mannheim Steamroller album) =

Studio album by Mannheim Steamroller
- Released: October 11, 2011
- Recorded: 1984, 1988, and 1995, and orchestra overdubs in 2011
- Genre: Christmas music
- Length: 51:18
- Label: American Gramaphone
- Producer: Chip Davis, Arnie Roth

Mannheim Steamroller chronology
Christmas 25th Anniversary Collection (2009)	Christmas Symphony (2011)	Safari (2012)

Mannheim Steamroller Christmas albums chronology
Christmas 25th Anniversary Collection (2009)	Christmas Symphony (2011)	Winter in Venice (2012)

Professional ratings
Review scores
Source	Rating
Allmusic	3/5 stars

Christmas Symphony is the twelfth Christmas music album released by American musical group Mannheim Steamroller. The album was originally released in 2011. Recorded in Prague, the album features the Czech Philharmonic, performing new recordings of previously released Mannheim Steamroller arrangements.

== Track listing ==
All tracks are traditional Christmas carols with unknown writers, unless otherwise noted.

No.	Title	Writer(s)	Length
1.	"Deck the Halls"		3:40
2.	"Greensleeves"		3:27
3.	"The Little Drummer Boy"	Katherine Kennicott Davis	4:02
4.	"The Holly and the Ivy"		3:03
5.	"Cantique de Noël (O Holy Night)"	Adolphe Adam	5:26
6.	"Hark! The Herald Trumpets Sing Fanfare"	Chip Davis	1:27
7.	"Hark! The Herald Angels Sing"	Charles Wesley / George Whitefield	3:30
8.	"Gagliarda"	Johann Hermann Schein	2:32
9.	"In dulci jubilo"		2:46
10.	"Wassail, Wassail"	Davis	2:20
11.	"Carol of the Birds"	Davis	2:03
12.	"I Saw Three Ships"		1:28
13.	"God Rest Ye, Merry Gentlemen"		1:41
14.	"God Rest Ye, Merry Gentlemen" (Rock)		4:38
15.	"Angels We Have Heard on High"	Music: Edward Shippen Barnes / Lyrics: James Chadwick	4:04
16.	"Stille Nacht (Silent Night)"	Music: Franz Xaver Gruber / Lyrics: Joseph Mohr	5:11
Total length:			51:18

- Tracks 8–13 are grouped on the cover as 'Renaissance Suite'

== Personnel ==
- Chip Davis – Liner Notes, Executive Producer, Arranged By, Recorder, Design, Other (Creator)
- Brian Ackley – Mixing
- Jackson Berkey – Piano, Harpsichord
- Ron Cooley – Lute, Acoustic guitar
- Dave Cwirko – Mastered by
- Jeffrey Handley – Timpani, Percussion
- Cenda Kotzmann – Pro Tools Recording Engineer
- Rex Martin – Tuba
- Petr Pycha – Contractor
- Evan Rea – Piano (tracks: 7)
- Arnie Roth – Producer, Orchestral arrangement, Violin, Soloist
- Eric Roth – Associate Producer, Orchestral arrangement, Digital Sequence Programming
- Judy Stone – Cello (tracks: 16)
- Chris Szuberia – Digital Sequence Programming
- George Vosburgh – Trumpet (tracks: 6)
- French Horn – David Kappy, Jonathan Boen, Norman Schweikert
- Percussion – Doug Waddell, Russ Knutson
- Trombone – Charles Vernon, Ed Kocher
- Trumpet (Piccolo) – Barbara Butler, George Vosburgh (tracks: 1, 6, 7, 15)
- Engineers – Mathew Prock, Stephen Baum
- Members Of The Czech Philharmonic Orchestra

== Charts ==
=== Weekly charts ===
Chart (2011)	Peak position
US Billboard 200	19
US Top Classical Albums (Billboard)	3
US Top Holiday Albums (Billboard)	2
US Independent Albums (Billboard)	1

=== Year-end charts ===
Chart (2011)	Position
US Top Classical Albums (Billboard)	20

Chart (2012)	Position
US Billboard 200	166
US Top Classical Albums (Billboard)	3
US Independent Albums (Billboard)	17
