= Christmas Celebration =

Compilation album by Mannheim Steamroller
- Released: October 12, 2004
- Recorded: 1984–2004
- Genre: Christmas
- Length: 65:08
- Label: American Gramaphone
- Producer: Chip Davis

Mannheim Steamroller chronology
Halloween: Monster Mix (2004)	Christmas Celebration (2004)	Romantic Themes (2005)

Mannheim Steamroller Christmas albums chronology
Christmas Extraordinaire (2001)	Christmas Celebration (2004)	Christmas Song (2007)

Professional ratings
Review scores
Source	Rating
Allmusic	link

Christmas Celebration is a compilation album by Mannheim Steamroller. It is the group's seventh Christmas album overall. The album was released in 2004 on CD and DVD-Audio by American Gramaphone to celebrate the 20th anniversary of the group's first Christmas album.

The album features eighteen Christmas songs in progressive rock and Renaissance styles, and includes a new track, "Celebration." A vocal version of "Traditions of Christmas," previously released only on a sampler CD included with the book Christmas: A Night Like No Other, is also included. The remaining songs are new mixes of previously released songs.

An edition of the album available exclusively at Target stores featured two extra songs: "The Holly and the Ivy" and "Messengers of Christmas."

Featured keyboard artist and Steamroller co-founder Jackson Berkey makes his final appearance on a Mannheim Steamroller Christmas album.

== Track listing ==
Writing credits adapted from liner notes except as indicated.

Standard edition
No.	Title	Lyrics	Music	Original album	Length
1.	"Celebration"		Chip Davis	Previously unreleased	2:37
2.	"Christmas Lullaby"		Davis	Christmas in the Aire	4:09
3.	"Deck the Halls"		Traditional (Welsh ayre)	Mannheim Steamroller Christmas	3:37
4.	"Veni Veni (O Come O Come Emanuel)" (featuring the Cambridge Singers)	Traditional	Traditional (12th century French)	A Fresh Aire Christmas	4:21
5.	"Away in a Manger"		James R. Murray	Christmas Extraordinaire	3:22
6.	"Hallelujah" (from The Messiah)		George F. Handel	Christmas Extraordinaire	4:43
7.	"O Tannenbaum" (featuring Johnny Mathis and the University of Michigan Men's Glee Club)	Ernst Anschütz	Traditional (German)	Christmas Extraordinaire	3:01
8.	"Wassail, Wassail"		Traditional (English carol)	Mannheim Steamroller Christmas	2:25
9.	"Carol of the Birds"		Traditional (Bas-Quercy)	Mannheim Steamroller Christmas	2:07
10.	"God Rest Ye, Merry Gentlemen" (Renaissance version)		Traditional (English carol)	Mannheim Steamroller Christmas	1:42
11.	"God Rest Ye Merry, Gentlemen" (rock version)		Traditional (English carol)	Mannheim Steamroller Christmas	4:31
12.	"Greensleeves"		Traditional (16th century English)	A Fresh Aire Christmas	3:29
13.	"Traditions of Christmas" (featuring LynnDee Mueller)	Davis	Davis	Christmas: A Night Like No Other (Note: Original recording from A Fresh Aire Christmas.)	3:40
14.	"Good King Wenceslas"	Traditional	Traditional (English carol)	Mannheim Steamroller Christmas	3:32
15.	"Carol of the Bells"	Peter Wilhousky	Mykola Leontovych (Note: Neither Wilhousky nor Leontovych is credited on the album, which simply describes the song as "19th century Ukrainian.")	A Fresh Aire Christmas	3:53
16.	"Auld Lang Syne"	Robert Burns	Traditional (Scottish ayre)	Christmas Extraordinaire	3:40
17.	"Fum, Fum, Fum"		Traditional (Spanish carol)	Christmas Extraordinaire	4:54
18.	"Stille Nacht (Silent Night)"		Franz Gruber	Mannheim Steamroller Christmas	5:25

Target edition bonus tracks
No.	Title	Music	Original album	Length
19.	"The Holly and the Ivy"	Traditional (French melody)	A Fresh Aire Christmas	3:03
20.	"Messengers of Christmas"	Davis	Previously unreleased (Note: Originally released with narration on The Christmas Angel; later re-released in this form on Christmasville.)	3:30

== See also ==
- List of Billboard Top Holiday Albums number ones of the 2000s
