= Fresh Aire V =

Studio album by Mannheim Steamroller
- Released: November 1, 1983
- Recorded: 1983
- Genre: New age, synth-pop
- Length: 34:41
- Label: American Gramaphone
- Producer: Chip Davis

Mannheim Steamroller chronology
Fresh Aire IV (1981)	Fresh Aire V (1983)	Mannheim Steamroller Christmas (1984)

Professional ratings
Review scores
Source	Rating
Allmusic	2.5/5 stars

Fresh Aire V is an album by Mannheim Steamroller, released in 1983. The music is inspired by Johannes Kepler's book The Dream.

This is the first album in the Fresh Aire series to feature the London Symphony Orchestra. Excerpts from "Dancin' in the Stars" was used as music in several local TV news opens, and a large portion of "Escape from the Atmosphere" was used as the main theme to KOMO-TV's Sunday evening public affairs talk show "Town Meeting" throughout most of the 1980s and 1990s. Part of the intro of "Escape from the Atmosphere" was used during the Gulf War for a Saudi Arabian emergency population warning broadcast during an Iraqi SCUD missile attack on the Eastern Province.

== Track listing ==
All tracks are written by Chip Davis.

No.	Title	Length
1.	"Lumen"	1:29
2.	"Escape from the Atmosphere"	10:38
3.	"Dancin' in the Stars"	5:13
4.	"Z-Row Gravity"	3:50
5.	"Creatures of Levania"	3:51
6.	"Earthrise/Return"	8:58
7.	"The Storm"	0:42
Total length:		34:41

== Personnel ==
- Chip Davis – percussion
- Jackson Berkey – keyboards
- Almeda Berkey - keyboards
- Eric Hansen – electric bass
- London Symphony Orchestra
- Cambridge Singers
