= Barbie as Rapunzel =

- DVD cover
- Directed by: Owen Hurley
- Written by: Elana Lesser; Cliff Ruby
- Based on: Rapunzel by the Brothers Grimm
- Produced by: Jesyca C. Durchin; Jennifer Twiner McCarron
- Starring: Kelly Sheridan; Cree Summer; Chantal Strand; Anjelica Huston
- Edited by: Greg Richardson
- Music by: Arnie Roth
- Production companies: Mainframe Entertainment; Mattel Entertainment
- Distributed by: North America: Artisan Home Entertainment (Family Home Entertainment); Overseas: Universal Pictures Video; UK and Ireland: Right Entertainment
- Release date: October 1, 2002
- Running time: 83 minutes
- Countries: Canada; United States
- Language: English

Barbie as Rapunzel is a 2002 CGI-animated fairytale film co-produced by Mainframe Entertainment and Mattel Entertainment, and distributed by Artisan Home Entertainment.

An adaptation of the 1812 German fairy tale "Rapunzel" by the Brothers Grimm, it is the second in the Barbie film series, with Kelly Sheridan providing the voice of Barbie.

Barbie as Rapunzel was released on VHS and DVD on October 1, 2002, later making a television debut on Nickelodeon on November 24, 2002. and was subsequently released overseas through Entertainment Rights and Universal Pictures Video. The film was nominated for eight DVD Premiere Awards, winning Best Original Score and Best Animated Character Performance for Gothel.

== Plot ==
Barbie tells the following story to her little sister, Kelly, who is insecure about her painting abilities.

Rapunzel is a young princess with long, floor-length hair, acting as a servant to the wicked witch Gothel, who claims Rapunzel was cruelly abandoned as a baby. Gothel resents Rapunzel's hobby of painting pictures, and demands Rapunzel spend all her time maintaining and cleaning the manor they live in, which is isolated from the rest of the world by a magic wall. Rapunzel's only friends are Penelope, a young dragon, and Hobie, an anxious rabbit.

One day, Rapunzel and her friends accidentally open a secret tunnel, where Rapunzel finds a silver hairbrush engraved with a loving message from her parents. This leads Rapunzel to question Gothel's story. Rapunzel continues down the tunnel and finds herself beyond the magic walls, near the kingdom outside. She saves young Princess Katrina from a hole with the help of Katrina's older brother, Prince Stefan. He explains the trap was set by King Wilhelm of the neighboring country, who has an ongoing feud with Stefan's father, King Frederick (because of which, families in the two kingdoms have been separated for years).

Rapunzel realizes she's been outside for a while and leaves in a rush, without learning Stefan's name. However, Gothel's pet ferret Otto sees Rapunzel and tells Gothel all that happened. Gothel scolds Rapunzel, demanding to know who she spoke with. When Rapunzel insists she doesn't know Stefan's name, Gothel destroys Rapunzel's art and supplies, and transforms her room into a high tower. Gothel also commands Penelope's father Hugo to keep Rapunzel prisoner. That night, as Rapunzel sleeps, the hairbrush she found magically transforms into a paintbrush.

When Rapunzel attempts to use the paintbrush on the tower wall, she magically paints a portal to the kingdom. She uses it to meet Stefan again, though she insists that he does not tell her his name so that she cannot reveal it to Gothel. They search for the origin of her paintbrush, and discover that it was made by a silversmith in Wilhelm's kingdom. Before Rapunzel leaves, Stefan gives her an invitation to the masquerade ball that night. She paints another portal to return to the tower.

To prepare for the masquerade, Rapunzel paints herself a beautiful gown, but is again found out by Otto. Gothel cuts off Rapunzel's hair, destroys the portal to the kingdom, and shatters the paintbrush. When Rapunzel once again cannot give Stefan's name, Gothel puts a spell on the tower to never release its lying prisoner. She also chains Hugo, intending to come back later and punish him for failing to keep Rapunzel from leaving.

At the ball, Gothel wears Rapunzel's hair and lures Stefan outside the palace, before attacking him. With the help of Hugo, Hobie, and Penelope, Rapunzel escapes the tower; as she never lied about not knowing Stefan's name, the spell does not affect her. The same night, King Wilhelm and his army also infiltrate the castle. Wilhelm accuses Frederick of kidnapping his daughter many years ago (the source of the feud). Gothel then reveals that she kidnapped Wilhelm's daughter as revenge for Wilhelm not returning her love.

Gothel tries to kill both Stefan and Wilhelm, but Rapunzel arrives, and Gothel attacks her instead, but not before accidentally causing a fire. Rapunzel and her friends trick Gothel and Otto into running through the portal to the tower; Gothel's spells are broken, releasing Hugo, who explains to a distraught Gothel that her lying heart has trapped her in the tower forever. After Stefan, Wilhelm, Frederick, and the knights put out the fire, Rapunzel is reunited with her parents and marries Stefan. The feud ends, and the two kingdoms are reunited.

In the end, Kelly feels better and begins painting after Barbie reminds her that creativity is the true magic in art.

== Cast ==
- Kelly Sheridan as Barbie / Princess Rapunzel
- Anjelica Huston as Gothel
- Cree Summer as Penelope
- Ian James Corlett as Hobie / Palace Guard
- Mark Hildreth as Prince Stefan
- David Kaye as Hugo / General
- Peter Kelamis as Otto / The Skinny Swordsman
- Russell Roberts as King Fredrick
- Christopher Gaze as King Wilhelm
- Terry Klassen as The Baker / The Fat Swordsman
- Chantal Strand as Kelly / Princess Katrina
- Danny McKinnon as Tommy
- Britt McKillip as Melody
- Jocelyne Loewen as Lorena
- Dale Wilson as the Silversmith

== Production ==
Barbie as Rapunzel was the second film produced by Mainframe Entertainment for Mattel, following Barbie in the Nutcracker (2001). Barbie as Rapunzel was produced over nine months. The characters were animated using Softimage V.3.9, with Maya used for visual effects. Performances for the 15 human characters were motion-captured over 16 days, and created using Motion Analysis, EVA, and Kaydara Filmbox. Motion-capture data was also purchased from Locomotion Studios in Wimberley, Texas for use in animating a CGI horse. The rest of the animal characters were animated using keyframe techniques. Motion-capture performer Cailin Stadnyk portrayed Barbie's movements.

Rapunzel's paintings are real art works by Amanda Dunbar digitally inserted into the film. Dunbar agreed to participate in the project because she "like[d] that the movie encourages art as a use of expression."

== Music ==
Barbie as Rapunzel features the original song "Constant as the Stars Above", written by Rob Hudnut and Arnie Roth, and performed by Jessica Brown. The song is heard as a 30-second lullaby in the film and reprised as a 2-and-a-half-minute version during the closing credits, after Samantha Mumba's "Wish Upon a Star". "Rapunzel's Theme" is performed by Becky Taylor. Roth composed the score, which was performed by the London Symphony Orchestra.

The film makes use of Antonín Dvořák's Symphony No. 9, "From The New World" (also known as the New World Symphony), while the music playing when Rapunzel is visiting the village is "Volte", from Michael Praetorius’ Terpsichore.

== Release ==
The DVD and VHS were released on October 1, 2002.

The DVD bonus features include the 26-minute documentary, "The Artist in Me", which profiles artist Amanda Dunbar along with interviews of children commenting on art and what inspires them. The DVD also has two interactive features: dress-up game "Dress-Up Rapunzel", and "Rapunzel's Art Gallery", a visual tour of paintings by famous artists teaching the difference between landscape, portrait and other styles of painting.

The film was distributed overseas by Entertainment Rights, who acquired distribution rights in March 2002 following the immense success of Barbie in the Nutcracker. Universal Pictures Visual Programming acquired worldwide video rights in May 2002, also following on with the success, while ER's home video subsidiary Right Entertainment handled video distribution in the United Kingdom and Ireland through its own separate deal with Universal.

== Reception ==
=== Commercial reception ===
Barbie as Rapunzel and associated merchandise sales grossed US$200 million in 2002.

=== Critical response ===
Eileen Clarke of Entertainment Weekly rated Barbie as Rapunzel a "B−". Praising the film as "terrific storytelling", Lynne Heffley of the Los Angeles Times wrote, "the artwork is gorgeously rendered and the characters are quirkily brought to life through the multilayered story and voice talent". Grant McIntyre of The Globe and Mail called the film "a delight", writing that it "has all the excitement, idyllic landscapes, gallantry, magic, deceit and romance that have made the [fairy tale] genre a favourite for centuries."

Reviewing the film for the South Florida Sun Sentinel, Scott Hettrick found "The animation is more sophisticated, the colors are far more vibrant, and the feature is filled with more characters, story lines and overall activity" than the previous year's Barbie in the Nutcracker. Hettrick praised the film's characters as engaging, and noted "in addition to Rapunzel, the story incorporates elements of everything from Cinderella, Romeo & Juliet and Dragonheart to Harold and the Purple Crayon".

A reviewer for Parenting called Barbie as Rapunzel "a truly charming update" to the original fairy tale, liking how "This time Rapunzel uses her head-not her hair-to gain her freedom." Los Angeles Daily News critic Chris J. Parker similarly praised the film's message and Barbie's character as a positive role model for young girls, and opined, "The movie is enhanced by its soundtrack, which features music performed by the London Symphony Orchestra. The computer-generated animation is still a bit clumsy, especially in this post-Shrek era. But it's watchable, especially for younger viewers."

K. Lee Benson of The Video Librarian called the film "A contemporary twist on a classic fairytale that will captivate Barbie's worshipful younger fans (though few others)". Rob Lowing of The Sun-Herald rated it 3 out of 5 stars, writing, "The Shrek-ish animation makes everyone resemble a doll, but pre-teens will like a chatty dragon and plenty of magic. The slightly twee result still has personality". Reviewing the film for Common Sense Media, Tracy Moore advised that parents "may want to offer a counter to the traditional fairy tale narrative here, but can still likely appreciate the focus on Rapunzel's good naturedness, her big heart, her emphasis on following her dreams, and her message about believing in yourself."

=== Awards ===
Year	Award	Category	Work(s)	Recipient(s)	Result	Reference
2002	DVD Premiere Award					
2002	DVD Premiere Award	Best Animated DVD Premiere Movie	Barbie as Rapunzel	Jesyca C. Durchin; Jennifer Twiner McCarron	Nominated	
2002	DVD Premiere Award	Best Director	Barbie as Rapunzel	Owen Hurley	Nominated	
2002	DVD Premiere Award	Best Original Score	Barbie as Rapunzel	Arnie Roth	Won	
2002	DVD Premiere Award	Best Visual Effects	Barbie as Rapunzel	Jason Gross	Nominated	
2002	DVD Premiere Award	Best Animated Character Performance	Gothel	Anjelica Huston (voice); Gino Nichele (animation director); Sebastian Brodin (animation director); Jean Gillmore (character designer); Sean Newton (character designer)	Won	
2002	DVD Premiere Award	Best Original Song	"Constant as the Stars Above"	Jessica Brown; Rob Hudnut (lyrics/music); Arnie Roth (lyrics/music)	Nominated	
2002	DVD Premiere Award	Best Original Song	"Rapunzel's Theme"	Becky Taylor; Arnie Roth (music)	Nominated	
2002	DVD Premiere Award	Best Original Song	"Wish Upon a Star"	Samantha Mumba	Nominated	

== See also ==
- List of Barbie films
