= FA1 =

FA1 or FA-1 may refer to:

- Arrows FA1, a racing car
- FA-1 (cable system), a fiber cable crossing the Atlantic
- Fresh Aire, the first album in the Fresh Aire album series
- ALCO FA-1, a diesel-electric locomotive
- Formula Acceleration 1, a formula racing series that started in 2014
