= List of Billboard Top Holiday Albums number ones of the 2000s =

The Top Holiday Albums chart is a seasonal chart published weekly by Billboard during the holiday months of each year. It tracks the best-selling Christmas and holiday albums in the United States. Throughout the 2000s, many albums, compilation albums, extended plays, and soundtrack albums reached the top spot of the chart. Italian opera singer and songwriter Andrea Bocelli received the first number one of the 2010s with his album My Christmas (2009).

== Chart history ==
Issue date	Title	Artist	Ref.
January 1, 2000	Faith: A Holiday Album	Kenny G	
January 8, 2000	Faith: A Holiday Album	Kenny G	
January 15, 2000	Faith: A Holiday Album	Kenny G	
November 25, 2000	My Kind of Christmas	Christina Aguilera	
December 2, 2000	Dream a Dream	Charlotte Church	
December 9, 2000	Dream a Dream	Charlotte Church	
December 16, 2000	Dream a Dream	Charlotte Church	
December 23, 2000	Dream a Dream	Charlotte Church	
December 30, 2000	Dream a Dream	Charlotte Church	
January 6, 2001	Dream a Dream	Charlotte Church	
January 13, 2001	My Kind of Christmas	Christina Aguilera	
January 20, 2001	My Kind of Christmas	Christina Aguilera	
November 17, 2001	Christmas Extraordinaire	Mannheim Steamroller	
November 24, 2001	Christmas Extraordinaire	Mannheim Steamroller	
December 1, 2001	Now That's What I Call Christmas!	Various artists	
December 8, 2001	Now That's What I Call Christmas!	Various artists	
December 15, 2001	Now That's What I Call Christmas!	Various artists	
December 22, 2001	Now That's What I Call Christmas!	Various artists	
December 29, 2001	Christmas Extraordinaire	Mannheim Steamroller	
January 5, 2002	Christmas Extraordinaire	Mannheim Steamroller	
January 12, 2002	Now That's What I Call Christmas!	Various artists	
January 19, 2002	Now That's What I Call Christmas!	Various artists	
November 16, 2002	Now That's What I Call Christmas!	Various artists	
November 23, 2002	Now That's What I Call Christmas!	Various artists	
November 30, 2002	Now That's What I Call Christmas!	Various artists	
December 7, 2002	Now That's What I Call Christmas!	Various artists	
December 14, 2002	Now That's What I Call Christmas!	Various artists	
December 21, 2002	Now That's What I Call Christmas!	Various artists	
December 28, 2002	Now That's What I Call Christmas!	Various artists	
January 4, 2003	Now That's What I Call Christmas!	Various artists	
January 11, 2003	Christmas Extraordinaire	Mannheim Steamroller	
January 18, 2003	Christmas Memories	Barbra Streisand	
November 15, 2003	Harry for the Holidays	Harry Connick Jr.	
November 22, 2003	Now That's What I Call Christmas!: The Signature Collection	Various artists	
November 29, 2003	Harry for the Holidays	Harry Connick Jr.	
December 6, 2003	Harry for the Holidays	Harry Connick Jr.	
December 13, 2003	Now That's What I Call Christmas!: The Signature Collection	Various artists	
December 20, 2003	Harry for the Holidays	Harry Connick Jr.	
December 27, 2003	Harry for the Holidays	Harry Connick Jr.	
January 3, 2004	Harry for the Holidays	Harry Connick Jr.	
January 10, 2004	Harry for the Holidays	Harry Connick Jr.	
January 17, 2004	Christmas Extraordinaire	Mannheim Steamroller	
November 13, 2004	Christmas Celebration	Mannheim Steamroller	
November 20, 2004	The Lost Christmas Eve	Trans-Siberian Orchestra	
November 27, 2004	The Polar Express	Soundtrack	
December 4, 2004	Merry Christmas with Love	Clay Aiken	
December 11, 2004	Merry Christmas with Love	Clay Aiken	
December 18, 2004	Merry Christmas with Love	Clay Aiken	
December 25, 2004	Merry Christmas with Love	Clay Aiken	
January 1, 2005	Merry Christmas with Love	Clay Aiken	
January 8, 2005	Merry Christmas with Love	Clay Aiken	
January 15, 2005	Christmas Celebration	Mannheim Steamroller	
November 19, 2005	Christmas Songs	Diana Krall featuring the Clayton/Hamilton Jazz Orchestra	
November 26, 2005	Christmas Songs	Diana Krall featuring the Clayton/Hamilton Jazz Orchestra	
December 3, 2005	The Christmas Collection	Il Divo	
December 10, 2005	The Christmas Collection	Il Divo	
December 17, 2005	The Christmas Collection	Il Divo	
December 24, 2005	Christmas Songs	Diana Krall featuring the Clayton/Hamilton Jazz Orchestra	
December 31, 2005	Christmas Songs	Diana Krall featuring the Clayton/Hamilton Jazz Orchestra	
January 7, 2006	Christmas Songs	Diana Krall featuring the Clayton/Hamilton Jazz Orchestra	
January 14, 2006	Christmas Songs	Diana Krall featuring the Clayton/Hamilton Jazz Orchestra	
January 21, 2006	A Very Merry Kidz Bop	Kidz Bop Kids	
November 18, 2006	Wintersong	Sarah McLachlan	
November 25, 2006	Wintersong	Sarah McLachlan	
December 2, 2006	Wintersong	Sarah McLachlan	
December 9, 2006	Wintersong	Sarah McLachlan	
December 16, 2006	Wintersong	Sarah McLachlan	
December 23, 2006	Wintersong	Sarah McLachlan	
December 30, 2006	Wintersong	Sarah McLachlan	
January 6, 2007	Wintersong	Sarah McLachlan	
January 13, 2007	Now That's What I Call Christmas! 3	Various artists	
January 20, 2007	Now That's What I Call Christmas! 3	Various artists	
January 27, 2007	Tim Burton's The Nightmare Before Christmas: Special Edition	Soundtrack	
October 20, 2007	Homecoming	Jim Brickman	
October 27, 2007	Noël	Josh Groban	
November 3, 2007	Noël	Josh Groban	
November 10, 2007	Noël	Josh Groban	
November 17, 2007	Noël	Josh Groban	
November 24, 2007	Noël	Josh Groban	
December 1, 2007	Noël	Josh Groban	
December 8, 2007	Noël	Josh Groban	
December 15, 2007	Noël	Josh Groban	
December 22, 2007	Noël	Josh Groban	
December 29, 2007	Noël	Josh Groban	
January 5, 2008	Noël	Josh Groban	
January 12, 2008	Noël	Josh Groban	
January 19, 2008	Sounds of the Season: The Elliott Yamin Holiday Collection	Elliott Yamin	
October 11, 2008	Tim Burton's The Nightmare Before Christmas: Special Edition	Soundtrack	
October 18, 2008	Nightmare Revisited	Various artists	
October 25, 2008	Nightmare Revisited	Various artists	
November 1, 2008	Nightmare Revisited	Various artists	
November 8, 2008	Nightmare Revisited	Various artists	
November 15, 2008	Noël	Josh Groban	
November 22, 2008	Noël	Josh Groban	
November 29, 2008	And Winter Came...	Enya	
December 6, 2008	And Winter Came...	Enya	
December 13, 2008	Noël	Josh Groban	
December 20, 2008	Noël	Josh Groban	
December 27, 2008	Noël	Josh Groban	
January 3, 2009	Noël	Josh Groban	
January 10, 2009	Noël	Josh Groban	
January 17, 2009	All Wrapped Up	Various artists	
October 10, 2009	And Winter Came...	Enya	
October 17, 2009	This Christmas	Michael McDonald	
October 24, 2009	Glory in the Highest: Christmas Songs of Worship	Chris Tomlin	
October 31, 2009	Christmas in the Heart	Bob Dylan	
November 7, 2009	Christmas in the Heart	Bob Dylan	
November 14, 2009	If on a Winter's Night...	Sting	
November 21, 2009	My Christmas	Andrea Bocelli	
November 28, 2009	My Christmas	Andrea Bocelli	
December 5, 2009	My Christmas	Andrea Bocelli	
December 12, 2009	My Christmas	Andrea Bocelli	
December 19, 2009	My Christmas	Andrea Bocelli	
December 26, 2009	My Christmas	Andrea Bocelli	
January 2, 2010	My Christmas	Andrea Bocelli	
January 9, 2010	My Christmas	Andrea Bocelli	
January 16, 2010	The Taylor Swift Holiday Collection	Taylor Swift	

== See also ==
- Billboard Christmas Holiday Charts
- Billboard Top Christmas Albums of the 1990s
- List of best-selling Christmas albums in the United States
- List of Billboard Holiday Songs number ones of the 2001–2010
- List of Billboard Top Holiday Albums number ones of the 2010s
