= Christmas Symphony =

Christmas Symphony may refer to:

- Symphony No. 49 (Hovhaness)
- Symphony No. 2 (Penderecki)
- "The Christmas Symphony" (Phil Perry, Joe Candullo, Charles Reade, published 1950), a song recorded by Perry Como in 1950
- Christmas Symphony (Mannheim Steamroller album)
