= Fresh Aire III =

Studio album by Mannheim Steamroller
- Released: September 1, 1979
- Recorded: 1979
- Genre: New-age; symphonic pop
- Length: 33:47
- Label: American Gramaphone

Mannheim Steamroller chronology
Fresh Aire II (1977)	Fresh Aire III (1979)	Fresh Aire IV (1981)

Professional ratings
Review scores
Source	Rating
Allmusic	4/5 stars

Fresh Aire III is the third album by the new-age musical group Mannheim Steamroller. It was originally released in 1979 on American Gramaphone. Each of the first four Fresh Aire albums is based on a season; Fresh Aire III's theme is summer. The opening track, Toccata, was played behind station IDs for OEPBS until 1986.

== Track listing ==
All tracks are written by Chip Davis.

No.	Title	Length
1.	"Toccata"	4:36
2.	"Small Wooden Bach'ses"	2:41
3.	"Amber"	2:47
4.	"Mere Image"	6:51
5.	"Morning"	2:54
6.	"Interlude 6"	2:51
7.	"The Cricket"	2:44
8.	"The Sky"	5:01
9.	"Midnight on a Full Moon"	3:16
Total length:		33:00

== Personnel ==
- Jackson Berkey – piano, harpsichord, synthesizer, clavichord, Fender Rhodes, tack piano, toy piano
- Eric Hansen – bass
- Chip Davis – drums, recorders, toys, recording of a cricket on "The Cricket"
- Ron Cooley – guitars
- Ray Still, Bob Jenkins – oboe
- Dave Kappy – French horn
- Omaha Strings
- Kansas City Strings
