= Sweet Tooth =

A sweet tooth is a fondness or craving for sweet foods.

Sweet Tooth may also refer to:

== Fictional characters ==
- Sweet Tooth, a character in the video game series Twisted Metal
- Sweet Tooth, a villain in the 1977 animated TV series The New Adventures of Batman
- Sweet-Tooth Jangala, a character in the PlayStation 2 port of the 2008 racing video game Speed Racer: The Videogame
- Sweet Tooth, a villain in the 2012 musical Holy Musical B@man!
- Dr. Sweet Tooth, a character in The 7D
- Sweet Tooth, a character in the defunct online MMPORG game Moshi Monsters

== Literature ==
- Sweet Tooth (comics), a comic strip in the British comic Whizzer and Chips
- A 1989 story by Lin Carter
- Sweet Tooth (novel), a 2012 novel by Ian McEwan
- Sweet Tooth (Vertigo), an American comic book limited series by Jeff Lemire

== Music ==
- "Sweet Tooth" (Bini song)
- "Sweettooth", a song by Jennie from Fallen Angel
- "Sweet Tooth", a song by Cavetown from Sleepyhead
- "Sweet Tooth", a song by Crowded House from Dreamers Are Waiting
- "Sweet Tooth", a song by Destroy Boys from Open Mouth, Open Heart
- "Sweet Tooth", a song by Diana Garnet and Lumin Tsukiboshi
- "Sweet Tooth", a song by Ericdoa from DOA
- "Sweet Tooth", a song by Free from Tons of Sobs
- "Sweet Tooth", a song by Marilyn Manson from Portrait of an American Family
- "Sweet Tooth", a song by Raheem DeVaughn from The Love Experience
- Sweet Tooth, a 2007 album by The Electric Confectionaires
- Sweet Tooth, a 2022 album by Odanak musician Mali Obomsawin
- Sweet Tooth, a 1990s British band that included Justin Broadrick
- Halloween: Sweet Tooth, a 2007 album in the Halloween series by Mannheim Steamroller

== Other uses ==
- The "sweet tooth" behavioral phenotype (i.e., a fondness or craving for sweet foods), caused by a single nucleotide polymorphism of the FGF21 gene
- Sweet Tooth (TV series), an American fantasy drama series based on the comic book
- Sweet Tooth, an American thoroughbred racehorse named 1977 Kentucky Broodmare of the Year
- Sweet Tooth, a strain of Cannabis that won the 2001 Cannabis Cup
- "Sweet Tooth (Battle for Dream Island)", a 2010 episode of the animated series
