= Halloween: Sweet Tooth =

Mannheim Steamroller Halloween Sweet Tooth

Compilation album by Mannheim Steamroller
- Released: 2006
- Recorded: 2003–2006
- Genre: Halloween music, new age, electronic, sound effects
- Length: 38:59
- Label: American Gramaphone (AG1034-2)
- Producer: Chip Davis

Mannheim Steamroller chronology
Halloween, Vol. 2: Creatures Collection (2006)	Mannheim Steamroller Halloween Sweet Tooth (2006)	Christmas Song (2007)

Sweet Tooth is the fourth Halloween CD released by Mannheim Steamroller, following Halloween (2-disc set, one is Music, the other sound effects), Monster Mix (one disc, music & efx mix), and Halloween 2: Creatures Collection (3-disc set; one is music, one is EFX & Dance Remixes, the last is DVD videos). Sweet Tooth is a one-disc release featuring 13 tracks produced between 2003 and 2006, collected and released in 2006.

== Track listing ==
All tracks are written by Chip Davis, except as indicated.

No.	Title	Writer(s)	Length
1.	"Enchanted Forest" (EFX)		0:42
2.	"Rock & Roll Graveyard"		3:51
3.	"Go to the Light" (EFX)		5:26
4.	"The Sorcerer's Apprentice"	Paul Dukas	4:50
5.	"Ghost Voices" (EFX)		4:42
6.	"Trick or Treat"		4:53
7.	"Devil's Oath" (EFX)		6:11
8.	"All Hallow's Eve"		3:42
9.	"Space-Men" (Creatures Lift Off Mix)		4:39
10.	"Harvest Dance"		3:01
11.	"Hall of the Mountain King"	Edvard Grieg	2:51
12.	"Purgatory's Pond" (EFX)		6:02
13.	"Creatures of the Night"		3:40
Total length:			38:59
