= Yellowstone: The Music of Nature =

Studio album by Mannheim Steamroller
- Released: November 14, 1989
- Genre: New age
- Length: 72:20
- Label: American Gramaphone
- Producer: Chip Davis

Mannheim Steamroller chronology
A Fresh Aire Christmas (1988)	Yellowstone: The Music of Nature (1989)	Fresh Aire 7 (1990)

Professional ratings
Review scores
Source	Rating
Allmusic	4.5/5 stars

Yellowstone: The Music of Nature is an album by Mannheim Steamroller, released in 1989. The concept pays homage to nature and to Yellowstone National Park. It was nominated for a Grammy Award for Best New Age Album in 1991.

The album is a compilation of older tracks from Chip Davis' Fresh Aire series and six new tracks consisting of fully orchestrated pieces from notable classical composers such as Claude Debussy, Antonio Vivaldi, Ottorino Respighi, and Ferde Grofé.

== Track listing ==
All tracks are written by Chip Davis, unless otherwise noted.

No.	Title	Writer(s)	Length
1.	"The Pines Of Rome: Pini Di Villa Borghese"	Ottorino Respighi	2:58
2.	"The Pines Of Rome: Pini Del Gianicolo"	Respighi	7:15
3.	"Interlude III"		2:26
4.	"Ballade"	Claude Debussy	7:28
5.	"Rhodes Suite: Sunrise at Rhodes"		3:44
6.	"Come Home to the Sea"		4:50
7.	"Morning"		2:46
8.	"Interlude VI"		3:11
9.	"La Primavera (Spring): 1 Allegro"	Antonio Vivaldi	3:47
10.	"La Primavera (Spring): 3 Allegro"	Vivaldi	4:57
11.	"Nepenthe"		5:27
12.	"The Sky"		5:02
13.	"Grand Canyon Suite: Cloud Burst"	Ferde Grofé	9:29
14.	"Earthrise"		4:02
15.	"Return to the Earth"		4:53
Total length:			72:20

== Personnel ==
- Chip Davis – Drums, Recorder, Conductor, Producer
- Jackson Berkey – Keyboards
- Neal Berntsen – Trumpet
- Peter Brusen – Bassoon
- Li-Kuo Chang – Viola (Principal)
- Catherine Brubaker, Craig Mumm, Daniel Strba, David Hildner, John Bartholomew, Martin Abrams, Patrick Brennan, Robert Swan, Roger Moulton – Viola
- Dale Clevenger – French Horn (Principal)
- Alice Render Clevenger, Daniel Gingrich, David Kappy, Norman Schweikert – French Horn
- Ron Cooley – Guitar
- Richard Graef – Flute (Principal)
- Caroline Pittman, Marie Moulton – Flute
- Joseph Guastafeste – Double Bass (Bass, Principal)
- Brad Opland, Collins Trier, Gregory Sarchet, Joseph Dibello, Stephen Lester – Double Bass (Bass)
- Barbara Haffner – Cello (Principal)
- Phil Blum, Leonard Chausow, Jonathan Pegis, Alan Rostoker, Judy Stone, Russell Powell, Gary Stucka, Felix Wurman – Cello
- Eric Hansen – Bass Guitar, Trumpet
- Stephen Hartman – Harp
- Ed Kocher – Trombone (Principal)
- Arthur Linsner, Charles Vernon – Trombone
- Burl Lane – Bassoon (Principal)
- Rex Martin – Tuba
- Robert Morgan – Oboe (Principal)
- Bob Jenkins, Ray Still, Sandy Rodgers – Oboe
- Louis J. Stout, Jr. – Orchestral Assistant
- George Vosburgh – Trumpet (Principal)
- Doug Waddell – Percussion (Principal)
- Joseph Pusateri, Patricia Dash, Russ Knutson – Percussion
- John Yeh – Clarinet (Principal)
- Lawrie Bloom, Stein Henrichsen – Clarinet
- Steven Shipps – Violin
- Arnold Roth – Violin I (Principal)
- Joseph Golan – Violin II (Principal)
- Blair Milton, David Taylor, Edgar Muenzer, Everett Zlatoff Mirsky, Florentina Ramniceanu, Fox Fehling, Jennie Wagner, Joyce Noh, Paul Phillips, Peter Labella, Ruben Gonzalez, Thomas Hall – Violin I
- Alison Dalton, David Myford, Gail Salvatori, Liba Shacht, Marlou Johnston, Mary Ann Mumm, Mihaela Ashkenasi, Otakar Sroubek, Ronald Satkiewicz, Susan Synnestvedt, Thomas Yang – Violin II
