= Mannheim Steamroller Meets the Mouse =

1999 album by Mannheim Steamroller

Studio album by Mannheim Steamroller
- Released: March 16, 1999
- Recorded: 1998
- Genre: Neoclassical new age; Electronica
- Length: 41:46
- Label: American Gramaphone; Walt Disney Records
- Producer: Chip Davis

Mannheim Steamroller chronology
| Renaissance Holiday (1998) | Mannheim Steamroller Meets the Mouse (1999) | Fresh Aire 8 (2000) |

Professional ratings
Review scores
| Source | Rating |
|---|---|
| Allmusic | 3/5 stars |

Mannheim Steamroller Meets the Mouse, taglined "Unique Musical Creations Based on Disney Songs," is an album by Mannheim Steamroller featuring recordings of songs from Disney movies and TV shows, released jointly by Walt Disney Records and American Gramaphone in 1999 on CD and cassette, and reissued in 2004 on DVD-Audio.

It includes both vintage songs from Walt Disney's era such as "Heigh-Ho" and "When You Wish Upon a Star," and then-recent songs such as "Go the Distance" and "Reflection."

== Track listing ==
Mannheim Steamroller Meets the Mouse track listing
| No. | Title | Writer(s) | Length |
|---|---|---|---|
| 1. | "Chim Chim Cher-ee" (from Mary Poppins) | Richard M. Sherman; Robert B. Sherman | 2:31 |
| 2. | "Zip-a-Dee-Doo-Dah" (from Song of the South) | Ray Gilbert; Allie Wrubel | 3:17 |
| 3. | "Under the Sea" (from The Little Mermaid) | Howard Ashman; Alan Menken | 3:49 |
| 4. | "Hakuna Matata" (from The Lion King) | Tim Rice; Elton John | 2:40 |
| 5. | "Supercalifragilisticexpialidocious" (from Mary Poppins) | R.M. Sherman; R.B. Sherman | 3:07 |
| 6. | "Go the Distance" (from Hercules) | David Zippel; Menken | 3:23 |
| 7. | "The Ballad of Davy Crockett" (from Davy Crockett) | Thomas W. Blackburn; George Bruns | 4:21 |
| 8. | "Heigh-Ho" (from Snow White and the Seven Dwarfs) | Larry Morey; Frank Churchill | 3:47 |
| 9. | "You've Got a Friend in Me" (from Toy Story) | Randy Newman | 3:50 |
| 10. | "When You Wish Upon a Star" (from Pinocchio) | Ned Washington; Leigh Harline | 2:41 |
| 11. | "Reflection" (from Mulan) | Zippel; Matthew Wilder | 5:24 |
| 12. | "Mickey Mouse March" (from The Mickey Mouse Club) | Jimmie Dodd | 2:56 |
| Total length: | | | 41:46 |
