= Chantal Strand =

Canadian actress (born 1987)

- Born: October 15, 1987 (age 39); Vancouver, British Columbia, Canada
- Education: Capilano University; University of British Columbia
- Occupation: Actress
- Years active: 1993–present

Chantal Strand (born October 15, 1987) is a Canadian actress and former stunt performer known for her vocal roles in animation, anime and video games.

Her vocal role credits include those for younger girl characters in the Barbie films between 2001 and 2009, Holly in The Charlie Horse Music Pizza, Sarah's Sister in Life-Size, Cassie in Dragon Tales, Tammy in Air Bud: World Pup, Air Bud: Seventh Inning Fetch and Air Bud Spikes Back, Sophie in ToddWorld and Molly O in Generation O!.

== Biography ==
At a young age, Strand started off doing stunts on Look Who's Talking Now with her twin sister, Michelle. Strand began working on many projects including The Outer Limits, The Commish, The Charlie Horse Music Pizza, Life-Size, Air Bud: World Pup, Air Bud: Seventh Inning Fetch and Air Bud: Spikes Back throughout her elementary and high school years. In 2010, Strand graduated from Capilano University with an Associate of Arts degree and then transferred to the University of British Columbia, graduating in 2013 with a Bachelor of Arts degree. Strand completed a Master of Journalism degree at the University of British Columbia in 2016. She has published articles with The Tyee.

== Career ==
Strand provided various voice-over roles in such animated shows as Generation O, Dragon Tales, Hamtaro, and Sabrina: The Animated Series, in which she played the characters of Gem, Pi, and Bernard. She played Lacus Clyne in Gundam SEED, and Gundam SEED Destiny, in which she voiced both Clyne and Meer Campbell. After Lamb Chop's Play-Along ended, Strand was cast as Holly in the short-lived spin off The Charlie Horse Music Pizza, starring Shari Lewis and Lamb Chop. The Charlie Horse Music Pizza was canceled on August 3, 1998, following Lewis' death.

Strand attended the 2002 Leo Awards when she was nominated for Best Supporting Performance in a Feature Length Drama. In June 2002, she received honours for contributing to the Emmy award-winning program The New Adventures of Madeline, going on to play the title character in two feature films. In the 2010s, Strand appeared in My Little Pony: Friendship Is Magic as the voice of Diamond Tiara and her mother, Spoiled Rich.

== Filmography ==
=== Animation ===
- A Very Fairy Christmas (2006) - Leah Adams
- Barbie in the Nutcracker (2001) – Kelly
- Kelly Dream Club (2002) - Kelly
- Barbie as Rapunzel (2002) – Kelly, Princess Katrina
- Barbie of Swan Lake (2003) – Kelly
- Barbie and the Magic of Pegasus (2005) – Rose
- Barbie in the 12 Dancing Princesses (2006) – Princess Lacey
- Barbie as the Island Princess (2007) – Sofia
- Barbie and the Diamond Castle (2008) – Stacie
- Bratz Fashion Pixiez (2007) – Breeana
- Bratz Babyz: The Movie (2006) – Nora
- Bratz Kidz Sleepover Adventure (2007) – Dana
- Care Bears: Adventures in Care-a-lot (2007) - McKenna
- Dinosaur Train – Valerie Velociraptor
- Dragon Tales – Cassie
- Everything's Rosie - Rosie (US dub)
- Fat Dog Mendoza – Uncas
- Finley the Fire Engine (2001/2006) – Jesse the tow truck (US dub)
- Generation O! – Molly O!
- Happy Monster Band – Ink (World Tour)
- LoliRock - Shelby (episode, "Blurred Vision")
- My Fair Madeline – Madeline
- Madeline in Tahiti - Madeline
- Make Way for Noddy – Skittles (US Re-Dub) (2002-2009)
- The New Adventures of Madeline (2000) – Danielle
- My Little Pony (G3 videos) – Pink Sunsparkle, StarSong, Tiddlywink
- My Little Pony: Friendship Is Magic – Diamond Tiara, Spoiled Rich, Bon Bon
- Rainbow Fish – Sea Filly
- RoboCop: Alpha Commando – Additional Voices
- Sabrina: The Animated Series – Gemini Stone
- Superbook - Miriam (episode, "The Birth of Moses")
- Super Duper Sumos – Prima
- The Little Prince - Linea/Lenaya in "The Planet of Cublix"
- The World of Piwi — Little Gelatos (1st voices)
- ToddWorld - Sophie
- Tom and Jerry: A Nutcracker Tale – Nibbles
- Tom and Jerry Tales – Nibbles (season 2)
- X-Men: Evolution – Wolfsbane

=== Anime ===
- Brain Powered – Akari Comodo
- Cardcaptors – Alex Mills (Episode 7), Anika (Episode 15)
- Dragon Drive – Sue
- Gintama° - Tama
- Gundam Seed – Lacus Clyne
- Gundam Seed Special Edition – Lacus Clyne
- Gundam Seed Destiny – Lacus Clyne, Meer Campbell
- Gundam Seed Destiny Special Edition – Lacus Clyne, Meer Campbell
- Gundam 00 – Feldt Grace
- Hamtaro – Bijou, Mia, Natalie
- Hikaru no Go – Akari Fujisaki
- Infinite Ryvius – Neeya
- Inuyasha – Mayu Ikeda, Asuka
- Junkers Come Here – Kazuko
- Mix Master – Penril, Poy
- Njasok – Shizuka Kushini
- Let's Go Quintuplets – Vanessa, Bridget
- Little Astro Boy - Pikko
- Powerpuff Girls Z – Mandy, Duchess Morbucks
- Pucca – Ching
- Ranma ½ – Temari Kaminarimon
- Shakugan no Shana – Kazumi Yoshida (Season 1)
- The Story of Saiunkoku – Korin
- Tico of the Seven Seas - Nanami Simpson
- Tokyo Underground – Ruri Sarasa

=== Video games ===
| Title | Role | Note |
|---|---|---|
| Dragon Tales: Dragon Seek | Cassie | |
| Dragon Tales: Dragon Frog Jamboree | Cassie | |
| Dragon Tales: Learn & Fly with Dragons | Cassie, Jamie, Zuzu, Val, Vic | |
| Dynasty Warriors: Gundam 2 | Lacus Clyne | English dub |
| Dynasty Warriors: Gundam 3 | Lacus Clyne | English dub |
| Dragalia Lost | Melody | |
| Sabrina: The Animated Series: Magical Adventure | Gemini Stone | |

=== Live action ===
| Title | Role | Notes |
|---|---|---|
| Air Bud Spikes Back | Tammy | |
| Air Bud: Seventh Inning Fetch | Tammy | |
| Air Bud: World Pup | Tammy | |
| The Outer Limits | Young Girl | episode: "Nightmare" |
| It's a Very Merry Muppet Christmas Movie | Nancy Nut-What | |
| L: Change the World | Maki Nikaido | voice |
| Life-Size | Sarah's Sister | |
| The Charlie Horse Music Pizza | Holly | |
| Poltergeist: The Legacy | Vickie | |
| The Commish | Margo Raphael | |

== Crew work ==
- Look Who's Talking Now - Stunt performer
