= Christmas Extraordinaire =

Studio album by Mannheim Steamroller
- Released: October 30, 2001
- Recorded: 2001
- Genre: Christmas
- Length: 45:20
- Label: American Gramaphone
- Producer: Chip Davis

Mannheim Steamroller chronology
Fresh Aire 8 (2000)	Christmas Extraordinaire (2001)	American Spirit (2003)

Mannheim Steamroller Christmas albums chronology
Renaissance Holiday (1998)	Christmas Extraordinaire (2001)	Christmas Celebration (2004)

Professional ratings
Review scores
Source	Rating
Allmusic	2.5/5 stars

Christmas Extraordinaire is Mannheim Steamroller's sixth Christmas album overall and the group's fourth Christmas studio album. The album was originally released in 2001. The song "O Tannenbaum" features a lead vocal by Johnny Mathis.

Five of the album's tracks were included in the group's 2004 compilation Christmas Celebration.

On June 21, 2004, Christmas Extraordinaire was certified Triple Platinum by the Recording Industry Association of America for shipment of three million copies in the United States.

As of November 2014, Christmas Extraordinaire is the fourteenth best-selling Christmas/holiday album in the U.S. in the Nielsen SoundScan era of music sales tracking (March 1991 – present), having sold 2,920,000 copies according to SoundScan.

== Track listing ==
Christmas Extraordinaire track listing
No.	Title	Lyrics	Music	Length
1.	"Hallelujah"		George F. Handel	4:43
2.	"White Christmas"		Irving Berlin	3:35
3.	"Away in a Manger"		James R. Murray	3:23
4.	"Faeries" ("Dance of the Sugar Plum Fairy" from The Nutcracker)		Peter Ilyich Tchaikovsky	2:29
5.	"Do You Hear What I Hear?"		Gloria Shayne Baker	4:06
6.	"The First Noel"		13th century English carol	3:38
7.	"Silver Bells"		Jay H. Livingston	4:28
8.	"Fum, Fum, Fum"		Traditional Catalan carol	4:51
9.	"Some Children See Him"		Alfred Burt	3:34
10.	"Winter Wonderland"		Felix Bernard	3:42
11.	"O Tannenbaum" (featuring Johnny Mathis and the University of Michigan Men's Glee Club)	Ernst Anschütz	Traditional German	3:01
12.	"Auld Lang Syne"	Robert Burns	Ancient Scottish air	3:42

== Personnel ==
- Chip Davis: Recorders, Drums
- Jackson Berkey: Harpsichord
- Ron Cooley: Guitar, Lute, Bass
- Roxanne Layton: Recorder, Crumhorns
- Arnie Roth: Violin Solo~The First Noel, Concertmaster
- Bobby Jenkins: Oboe Solo
- Johnny Mathis: Vocals on "O Tannenbaum"

== See also ==
- List of Billboard Top Holiday Albums number ones of the 2000s
