= Barbie in the 12 Dancing Princesses =

2006 film by Greg Richardson

- DVD cover
- Directed by: Greg Richardson
- Written by: Elana Lesser; Cliff Ruby
- Based on: "The Twelve Dancing Princesses" by the Brothers Grimm
- Produced by: Shea Wageman
- Starring: Kelly Sheridan; Nicole Oliver; Jennifer Copping; Kathleen Barr; Chiara Zanni; Adrienne Carter; Ashleigh Ball; Britt McKillip; Maddy Copozzi; Chantal Strand; Catherine O'Hara; Shawn MacDonald; Christopher Gaze
- Edited by: Colin Adams
- Music by: Arnie Roth
- Production companies: Mattel Entertainment; Mainframe Entertainment
- Distributed by: Universal Studios Home Entertainment (Note: Released under Entertainment Rights/Classic Media outside North America, with Right Entertainment distributing in the United Kingdom)
- Release dates: September 10, 2006 (Nickelodeon); September 19, 2006 (DVD)
- Running time: 82 minutes
- Countries: Canada; United States
- Language: English

Barbie in the 12 Dancing Princesses is a 2006 CGI-animated dance film directed by Greg Richardson and written by Elana Lesser and Clifford "Cliff" Ruby that premiered on Nickelodeon on September 10 and DVD 9 days later.

Loosely based on the German fairy tale "The Twelve Dancing Princesses", it is the 9th entry in the Barbie film series and features the voice of Kelly Sheridan as the Barbie protagonist. This is the first Barbie film to be distributed by Universal Studios Home Entertainment in North America, to-which Universal's international subsidiary already handled distribution to the previous films under a deal with Entertainment Rights.

Music for the film was composed by Arnie Roth. "Shine", the end credits song written by Roth, Amy Powers and Rob Hudnut, was nominated for a 2007 Emmy Award.

In 2026, Barbie in the 12 Dancing Princesses was uploaded in its entirety on the Barbie franchise's official YouTube channel.

== Plot ==
Genevieve (played by Barbie) is one of twelve princesses who share a passion for dancing and live in a castle with their widowed father, King Randolph. Unbeknownst to the princesses, other people consider them improper for having unique but unladylike hobbies and interests. King Randolph summons his cousin, Duchess Rowena, to turn them into proper ladies. However, the Duchess removes all color, music, and joy from the palace, trying to break the girls' spirits.

On their youngest sisters' birthday, the other sisters gift them a copy of their late mother's favorite story, wherein a princess discovers a magical land and dances there for three nights before it vanishes. Looking at the story and the tiles on their bedroom floor, Genevieve discovers how to open a portal into the magical land. Upon entering, they dance the night away. They learn the hanging golden flowers grant wishes, the statues can come to life, and the water has healing properties.

The next day, the princesses appear tired and Rowena finds their new dancing shoes worn out, arousing her suspicions. King Randolph falls ill, so Genevieve asks the royal cobbler, Derek, to investigate Rowena's true intentions. That night, the princesses return to the magical land; Derek confronts a local apothecary and deduces that Rowena has been poisoning the King.

The next morning, the sisters are again exhausted. Rowena, refusing to believe the sisters when they tell her the truth, forces them into servitude. After overhearing Rowena maneuver the King into referring to his daughters as burdens, the heartbroken princesses return to the magical land for a third time, and Rowena finds them missing the next morning.

After learning that the princesses are missing, Derek figures out how to open the portal and makes his way into the magical land. Rowena's pet monkey, Brutus, spies on Derek and leads Rowena through after him; she steals one of the wish-granting flowers. The princesses decide to go home and help their father; however, Rowena returns to the palace ahead of them and has her henchman, Desmond, destroy the portal. Derek and Genevieve figure out how to activate another portal by dancing together, freeing the group.

Once home, they find out that the King is dying and that Rowena has taken over as Queen. The Duchess uses the golden flower to wish for Genevieve to dance forever without rest, but Genevieve blows the magic dust back at her with a hand fan, forcing Rowena to dance uncontrollably. When Desmond tries to help Rowena, he is pulled into the spell, and the two dance their way out of the castle. Lacey uses the healing water she took from the magic land to revive her father. King Randolph affirms his unconditional love for his daughters and Genevieve and Derek celebrate their wedding.

== Characters ==
=== Princesses ===
Each of the 12 Princesses is designated with a gemstone and a flower. Each princess' flower appears on their dresses, the book gifted to each of them, and on the stones on the floor of their bedroom, and each of the princesses' names begin with the first 12 letters of the alphabet.

- Ashlyn is the 22-year-old eldest sister, and heir apparent. She is practical, calm and knowledgeable. She loves music, especially playing the flute and oboe. She is straightforward and cares for her younger sisters, for whom she tries to act as a role model. Her flower is the purple geranium and her gemstone is a garnet. She bears the most resemblance to her mother Queen Isabella, and wears a purple dress.
- Blair is the 21-year-old 2nd sister. She loves horseback riding and collects music boxes. Feisty and outspoken, Blair is always the first to voice her opinion, especially her complaints about Rowena's presence in their lives. Her flower is larkspur and her gemstone is a ruby. She wears a red dress.
- Courtney is the 20-year-old 3rd sister and is close to Ashlyn and Blair. She seems to be the shyest of the twelve sisters. Her favorite hobby is reading, which makes her intelligent and open-minded, but often renders her totally oblivious to her surroundings. Her flower is the forget-me-not and her gemstone is a sapphire. She wears a blue dress.
- Delia is the adventurous 19-year-old 4th sister. She loves sports like her sister Edeline, especially croquet and horseback riding. Her flower is the sunflower and her gemstone is a green peridot. She wears a green dress.
- Edeline is the sporty 18-year-old 5th sister. She loves to play sports like her sister Delia, her favorites being badminton and croquet. She also tends to be messy and disorganized. Her flower is honeysuckle and her gemstone is orange citrine. She wears an orange dress.
- Fallon is the 17-year-old 6th sister. She loves animals, plays the harp, and is a romantic who hopes everyone can find their happily ever after. She likes hearts, lace, and writing stories. Her flower is the camellia and her gemstone is a pearl. She wears a magenta dress.
- Barbie as Genevieve is the 16-year-old 7th sister, and the main protagonist of the film. She tends to run late for all sorts of occasions. She is also an experienced chess player. Next to her family, Genevieve loves dancing more than anything. Derek, the royal cobbler, harbors romantic feelings for her. Her flower is the pink rose and her gemstone is a pink opal. She wears a hot pink and white dress.
- Hadley is the 13-year-old 8th sister and Isla's fraternal twin. She loves to walk on stilts, an interest she shares with Isla. Her flower is the narcissus and her gemstone is a topaz. She wears a turquoise dress.
- Skipper as Isla is the 13-year-old 9th sister and Hadley's fraternal twin. Isla is a skilled acrobat and enjoys walking on stilts with her twin. Her flower is the lily of the valley and her gemstone is an emerald. She wears a light violet dress.
- Chelsea as Janessa is the 5-year-old 10th sister, the eldest and leader of the young fraternal triplets. She is interested in bugs and loves collecting them. While she may be bossy at times, her intentions are always good. Her flower is the jonquil and her gemstone is aquamarine. She wears a light blue dress.
- Becky as Kathleen is the 5-year-old 11th sister, the middle triplet, and is close with both triplets. She loves art and enjoys painting, but tends to be messy like her big sister, Edeline. Kathleen is down-to-earth and helps keep balance among the triplets. Her flower is the daisy and her gemstone is a pink diamond. She wears a light pink and yellow dress.
- Kelly as Lacey is the 5-year-old youngest triplet as well as the youngest of all 12 sisters. She is very close to her big sister, Genevieve and likes to collect teddy bears. Being the youngest, she is timid, somewhat clumsy and frequently needs help for the simplest things. Even though she loves her sisters and her father, Lacey often wonders about where she belongs in her large family and struggles with her self-worth. Her flower is the white lily and her gemstone is an amethyst. She wears a lavender dress.

=== Other ===
- Ken as Derek is a handsome, 16 year old royal cobbler. He is friends with Genevieve and her sisters, secretly in love with Genevieve, and becomes the princesses' main ally in stopping Rowena. At the end of the film, he and Genevieve are happily wedded.
- Felix is Derek's talking parrot. He wants Derek and Genevieve to be together, often blabbing hints about how Derek feels to Genevieve, which causes great embarrassment for his master.
- Duchess Rowena is King Randolph's cousin and the primary antagonist of the film. She is brought to the castle to help the king raise his twelve daughters. She seeks to steal the throne by poisoning Randolph and getting rid of the twelve princesses. She is doomed to dance forever when a spell she tried to use on Genevieve backfires.
- King Randolph is the widower father of the twelve dancing princesses. He loves his daughters more than anything, but is determined to turn them into "proper princesses" with Rowena. Little does he know Rowena is slowly poisoning him in an attempt to steal his throne and that it is up to his "unruly" daughters to save him.
- Desmond is Rowena's large and ruthless footman. He seems to have a crush on Rowena, doing anything she says to please her. He is doomed to dance with her forever when he tries to free the cursed duchess.
- Twyla is Genevieve's pet kitten. She tries to act tough in front of her enemies and is constantly fighting with Rowena's monkey, Brutus. She is friends with Felix and believes that she is related to the tigers of India.
- Brutus is Rowena's pet chimpanzee, who is just as cruel and arrogant as his mistress. He loves making Twyla angry and often spies on the princesses to find ways to get them in trouble with Rowena. He ends up being defeated when Twyla injures his tail with a mouse trap, forcing him to run away when Rowena is forced to dance away from the castle.
- Mr. Fabian is an apothecary who sells poison to Rowena in exchange for stolen goods. He is eventually tracked down by Derek, who trades his horse for Queen Isabella's goblet.
- Queen Isabella is the late mother of the twelve princesses. She is seen in the movie through a portrait that hangs near the entrance of the castle. Even in death, she helps her daughters discover the magical kingdom and the importance of family. Her goblet is stolen by Rowena to purchase poison from the apothecary.

== Cast ==
- Kelly Sheridan as Genevieve (played by Barbie)
  - Melissa Lyons as the singing voice of Genevieve for "The Birthday Song"
- Catherine O'Hara as Duchess Rowena
- Nicole Oliver as Ashlyn, Twyla
- Jennifer Copping as Blair
- Lalainia Lindbjerg as Courtney
- Kathleen Barr as Delia
- Chiara Zanni as Edeline
- Adrienne Carter as Fallon
- Ashleigh Ball as Hadley and Isla
- Britt McKillip as Janessa
- Maddy Capozzi as Kathleen
- Chantal Strand as Lacey
- Shawn Macdonald as Derek (played by Ken)
- Christopher Gaze as King Randolph
- Garry Chalk as Desmond
- Peter Kelamis as Brutus, Sentry #4
- Gabe Khouth as Felix
- Mark Oliver as Royal Butler, Fabian, Sentry #1, Guard #1
- David Kaye as Royal Doctor, Sentry #2
- Jonathan Holmes as Ambassador

== Production ==
The film's ballet scenes feature the movement of New York City Ballet dancers, computer animated through motion capture imaging.

== Music ==
The songs featured in this film are:

- 12 Dancing Princesses theme song, based on the theme from the Siciliana in Respighi's Ancient Airs and Dances
- Shine (End credit song), performed by Cassidy Ladden
- The Birthday Song (Sang for the triplets, until Rowena stopped it)
- Argeers by John Playford (When Derek plays a tune for the princesses)
- Sacerdotes Domini by William Byrd (Sang by the princesses at their father's sickbed)
- Mendelssohn's A Midsummer Night's Dream – Nocturne (When the girls first step in the magical world and ride the boat)
- Mendelssohn's A Midsummer Night's Dream – Fairies' March (When the triplets fall asleep and the other girls dance)
- Mendelssohn's Fourth Symphony, the third and first movement (Played when the princesses are dancing on the first and second night respectively)
- Mendelssohn's Fourth Symphony, second movement (Played when Rowena accuses the girls of lying and places them in servitude)
- Mendelssohn's Fifth Symphony, second movement (Played when the girls dance with the brass statues)
- Mendelssohn's Fourth Symphony, last movement (Played at the final confrontation of Rowena and Desmond by the princesses and Derek)
- Gottschalk's Grande Tarantelle for piano and orchestra (Played when Rowena and Desmond dance at the end)

== Reception ==
=== Commercial reception ===
In the October 14, 2006 issue of Billboard, Barbie in the 12 Dancing Princesses debuted at number one on the Top DVD Sales chart. The film sold nearly 500,000 units in its first week, 15% more than the previous princess-themed film in the Barbie franchise.

=== Critical response ===
Jill Stark of The Sunday Age rated the film 3/5 stars, calling it "good wholesome stuff, though the story sometimes plods." Describing the plot as "Footloose in a fairy-tale setting", D. Liebenson of The Video Librarian wrote, "Barbie in the 12 Dancing Princesses serves up plenty of magic to enchant young, starry-eyed Barbie fans and aspiring dancers", and "the CGI animation sparkles, with each character boasting an otherworldly porcelain sheen."

Reviewing the film for Common Sense Media, Teresa Talerico described it as "an innocent story about sisterly love and ballet dancing" but advised that the villain subplot and poisoning scenes may be frightening for young children. Talerico also wrote that the 12 sisters' characters weren't well developed. While enjoying the extended dance sequences and deeming the music the best original score from any Barbie film, Amy Loughlin of ScreenHub felt that the story and moral lesson were both vague.

=== Awards ===
- Daytime Emmy Award for Original Song in a Children's, Young Adult or Animated Program — Nominated ("Shine" by Arnie Roth, composer; Amy Powers, lyricist; Robert Hudnut, lyricist)
- Leo Award for Best Animation Program or Series — Nominated (Jeysca Durchin Schnepp, Jennifer Twiner McCarron, Shea Wageman – Producers)
- Leo Award for Best Direction/Storyboarding in an Animation Program or Series — Nominated (Greg Richardson)

== Merchandise ==
The line of tie-in Barbie in the 12 Dancing Princesses products included dolls, playsets and accessories. Dolls of each of the 12 princess characters and Derek were released, as well as a "Magic Dance Castle" dollhouse, a princess vanity for the 12 dolls, a horse and carriage set that can seat all 12 dolls, and two Twyla plush toys.

Video games were released by Activision to tie in with the film on different platforms such as the Game Boy Advance, Microsoft Windows, Nintendo DS and PlayStation 2.

== Cultural impact and legacy ==
Barbie in the 12 Dancing Princesses is frequently ranked by entertainment websites as one of the best films in the Barbie animated film franchise. It is a common favourite among fans. According to a Buzzfeed article by Sara Thompson, it is among the films and shows that represent "peak 2000s girl culture".

== See also ==
- List of Barbie films
