= A Fresh Aire Christmas =

Studio album by Mannheim Steamroller
- Released: September 15, 1988
- Recorded: 1987–1988
- Genre: Christmas, symphonic pop
- Length: 40:57
- Label: American Gramaphone
- Producer: Chip Davis

Mannheim Steamroller chronology
Classical Gas (1987)	A Fresh Aire Christmas (1988)	Yellowstone: The Music of Nature (1989)

Mannheim Steamroller Christmas albums chronology
Mannheim Steamroller Christmas (1984)	A Fresh Aire Christmas (1988)	Christmas in the Aire (1995)

Professional ratings
Review scores
Source	Rating
AllMusic	4.5/5 stars

A Fresh Aire Christmas is the tenth studio album and second Christmas album by American musical group Mannheim Steamroller, released in 1988.

The album was the last to feature Eric Hansen as a member of the band. It is the highest selling album in the Chip Davis/Mannheim Steamroller music catalog.

When selecting the tracks, Chip Davis had requested of fans to submit three of their favorite Christmas songs. He then tabulated the results and sent a note of thanks and a copy of the album to those fans who had a song selected.

On June 21, 2004, A Fresh Aire Christmas was certified by the Recording Industry Association of America for shipment of six million copies in the United States, making it one of the best-selling holiday albums in the U.S.

Four of the album's tracks were included in the group's 2004 compilation Christmas Celebration.

As of November 2014, A Fresh Aire Christmas is the sixth best-selling Christmas/holiday album in the U.S. for the Nielsen SoundScan era of music sales tracking (March 1991 – present), having sold 3,660,000 copies during this period according to SoundScan. The album has become the band's biggest success, even surpassing their first Christmas release, Mannheim Steamroller Christmas.

== Track listing ==
A Fresh Aire Christmas track listing
No.	Title	Lyrics	Music	Length
1.	"Hark! The Herald Trumpets Sing"		Chip Davis (Note: Uncredited in the tracklist, described as "20th century (16th century style)." Davis credits himself in the liner notes, acknowledging the influence of composer Giovanni Gabrieli.)	1:23
2.	"Hark! The Herald Angels Sing"		Traditional (18th century German)	3:27
3.	"Veni Veni (O Come, O Come, Emmanuel)" (featuring the Cambridge Singers)	Traditional	Traditional (12th century French)	4:15
4.	"The Holly and the Ivy"		Traditional (ancient French)	2:58
5.	"The Little Drummer Boy"		Katherine Kennicott Davis (Note: Uncredited; attributed as "20th century American.")	4:06
6.	"Still, still, still"		Traditional (Austrian)	3:39
7.	"Lo, How a Rose E'er Blooming"		Traditional (15th century German)	2:23
8.	"In Dulci Jubilo"		Traditional (16th century German)	2:43
9.	"Greensleeves"		Traditional (16th century English)	3:24
10.	"Carol of the Bells"	Peter Wilhousky	Mykola Leontovych (Note: Neither Wilhousky nor Leontovych is credited; attributed as "19th century Ukrainian.")	3:48
11.	"Traditions of Christmas"		Davis	3:32
12.	"Cantique de Noel (O Holy Night)"		Adolphe Adam (Note: Uncredited in tracklist and attributed as "19th century French"; Davis credits Adam in the liner notes.)	5:19
