= Barbie in the Nutcracker =

2001 film by Owen Hurley

- DVD cover
- Directed by: Owen Hurley
- Written by: Linda Engelsiepen; Hilary Hinkle
- Screenplay by: Rob Hudnut Hilary Hinkle Linda Engelsiepen
- Based on: "The Nutcracker and the Mouse King" by E. T. A. Hoffmann; The Nutcracker by Pyotr Ilyich Tchaikovsky
- Produced by: Jesyca C. Durchin; Jennifer Twiner McCaron
- Starring: Kelly Sheridan; Tim Curry; Kirby Morrow; Chantal Strand
- Edited by: Anne Hoerber
- Music by: Arnie Roth
- Production companies: Mainframe Entertainment; Mattel Entertainment
- Distributed by: North America: Artisan Home Entertainment (Family Home Entertainment); Overseas: Universal Pictures Video; UK and Ireland: Right Entertainment
- Release date: October 2, 2001 (VHS)
- Running time: 77 minutes
- Countries: Canada; United States
- Language: English
- Budget: $15 million (including marketing)

Barbie in the Nutcracker is a 2001 Canadian-American CGI-animated fantasy film co-produced by Mainframe Entertainment and Mattel Entertainment, and distributed by Artisan Home Entertainment.

Loosely adapted from E. T. A. Hoffmann's 1816 short story, "The Nutcracker and the Mouse King", and featuring music based from Tchaikovsky's 1892 ballet, The Nutcracker, it marked the character's first film since the 1987 television specials; Barbie and the Rockers: Out of This World and Barbie and the Sensations: Rockin' Back to Earth, with Kelly Sheridan providing the voice of Barbie. It was also the first Barbie movie to be in computer-generated imagery (CGI).

Barbie in the Nutcracker premiered on VHS on October 2, 2001, by Artisan, followed up with a DVD release a few weeks later on October 23. before being subsequently released overseas through Entertainment Rights and Universal Pictures Video. The film sold more than 3.4 million units on DVD by 2002, and grossed $150 million in total sales. It won the Video Premiere Award for Best Animated Video Premiere Movie.

A remake of the film with the late Tim Curry was released on Netflix in November 1, 2026.

== Plot ==
Barbie tells the following story to her little sister, Kelly, who is having trouble rehearsing a ballet solo.

In 1890s Germany, Clara lives with Drosselmeyer, her stern grandfather, and Tommy, her younger brother. On the night of Christmas Eve, they receive a surprise visit from their aunt Elizabeth. She brings toys for the siblings, including a nutcracker for Clara. Tommy attempts to wrestle it from Clara and damages the Nutcracker's arm. Clara mends the toy and falls asleep by the Christmas tree.

At midnight, magical dust travels about the room, and Clara awakens to see her Nutcracker suddenly alive, and fighting an army of mice led by the wicked Mouse King. The Mouse King uses magic to shrink her down to his size, and Clara and the Nutcracker make a swift escape.

The Nutcracker explains that he was also transformed by the Mouse King, and he and Clara decide to find the Sugarplum Princess, the only person who can undo the spells on both of them. The owl on the grandfather clock gives them directions to the Sugarplum Princess and gives Clara a locket that will send her back home when she opens it.

The Nutcracker and Clara go through a mouse hole into a magical portal to an ice cave. They leave with the help of the snow fairies and enter the Nutcracker's home, Parthenia. The two journey to the gingerbread village. There, they meet two children, who tell them that the rightful heir to the throne, Prince Eric, has gone missing. The group narrowly escapes the Mouse King's army when they are saved by Major Mint and Captain Candy, who lead a small group of villagers in hiding. Mint reveals that Prince Eric's careless attitude led the former king to pronounce the Mouse as temporary ruler until Eric accepted his responsibilities. Clara realizes that the Nutcracker is the missing Prince Eric; when the Mouse decided he wanted to be king permanently, he turned Eric into a Nutcracker. Eric hopes to redeem himself and make things right again.

Clara and the Nutcracker, joined by Mint and Candy, set off on a journey to reach the Sugarplum Princess. While Mint and Candy prepare a boat, Clara and the Nutcracker manage to free a group of flower fairies who had been trapped in a well by the Mouse King. The group is suddenly attacked by a rock giant, sent by the Mouse King to stop them from reaching the Princess. The snow fairies arrive and freeze the sea, followed by a horse pulling a sled, allowing the group to cross. The Nutcracker uses his sword to crack the ice, causing the rock giant to sink into the sea.

The group reaches the Princess's island, but it is revealed to be a trap. The Nutcracker, Mint, and Candy are caged and carried off by the Mouse King's bat henchman Pimm, leaving Clara behind. The flower fairies help carry Clara off the island and to the Mouse King's castle, where she frees her friends. The Nutcracker battles with the Mouse King, who has his own spell reflected at him, shrinking him to the size of a real mouse and causing him to flee. The fight leaves the Nutcracker severely injured; Clara kisses him, and he is restored to his true form as Eric. Clara, because she was able to break the spell and save her friends, is revealed herself to be the Sugarplum Princess. Eric is crowned king, and the couple, who have fallen in love, dance as the citizens celebrate and the land is restored to its former natural beauty. The shrunken Mouse King returns, riding on Pimm's back, and snatches Clara's locket, opening it before being knocked out of the sky with a snowball. At its opening, the locket's magic activates, and Clara dematerializes before she can say goodbye, magically transported back home.

Clara wakes up where she fell asleep. The Nutcracker is gone, and she runs to her grandfather, who dismisses the story as her imagination. Just then, Aunt Elizabeth returns with a young man who is revealed to be Eric, whom she introduces to Clara. Eric asks her to dance. A snow globe shows Prince Eric and the Sugarplum Princess dancing happily in the palace courtyard.

As Barbie ends the story, Kelly realizes the importance of not giving up, and she and Barbie finally manage to dance the solo perfectly.

== Cast ==
- Kelly Sheridan as Barbie/Clara
- Kirby Morrow as The Nutcracker/King Eric
- Tim Curry as The Mouse King
- Peter Kelamis as Pimm the Bat
- Christopher Gaze as Major Mint
- Ian James Corlett as Captain Candy
- Chantal Strand as Kelly
- Kathleen Barr as Aunt Elizabeth Drosselmayer/Owl
- French Tickner as Grandfather Drosselmayer
- Alex Doduk as Tommy
- Britt McKillip as Peppermint Girl
- Danny McKinnon as Gingerbread Boy
- Shona Galbraith as Fairies

== Production ==
Barbie in the Nutcracker was choreographed by the New York City Ballet master-in-chief Peter Martins. The film's music, based on Tchaikovsky's score for The Nutcracker, was performed by the London Symphony Orchestra. The film's ballet sequences feature the movement of New York City Ballet dancers animated through motion capture imaging.

The film was animated over four months by 22 artists at Mainframe Entertainment, using Softimage and Maya for some of the visual effects. All the non-human characters were keyframed, while the humans were motion-captured with the Motion Analysis system (including Filmbox and Eva software) to achieve a rotoscopic look. The animators spent one week working with the New York City Ballet at Acclaim Motion Capture Studio in Long Island, taking three days to motion-capture the dancers.

According to Jennifer Twiner McCarron, CGI producer at Mainframe and a co-producer on the film, Mattel wanted a "very soft and stylized look" for Barbie, and did not want the character to appear or move like a doll, as she had in her brief appearance in Toy Story 2. McCarron stated, "We did lots of lighting tests and lots of lighting and hair shader development. We used Eddie, a softer add-on that gets around the blurriness." One animator's job was dedicated to animating the movement of Barbie's hair. McCarron stated, "[Barbie's] hair is always down on her neck, not braided like [Princess Fiona] in Shrek, so we had to keep it down. A hair rig was built so that when she moved it wouldn't intersect with her. Her hair was like a separate character, what with all the attention and care it received."

Screenwriter Rob Hudnut stated that the film aimed to carry a message to empower girls. One of the story's characters, Clara's godfather, was replaced with a woman, Aunt Elizabeth, a world traveller. Hudnut said, "That was purely to have a mentor/role model figure for the Clara character. We wanted her to be a modern woman -- even though we set the movie at the turn of the century." Kelly Sheridan, the voice actress of Barbie/Clara, stated that the mantra for the character was "kind, clever, brave", and at times during production, changes were made to her characterization at the request of Mattel representatives. A scene in the script in which Barbie as Clara stumbles while carrying a tray was removed because "Barbie would never stumble"; on another occasion, when Sheridan was recording the scene in which Clara confronts the Mouse King, a Mattel representative asked if she could sound less angry, "Because Barbie would never be angry, even confronting the villain".

Sound post-production was done at Vitello Productions in Hollywood.

=== New York City Ballet dancers ===
- Charles Askegard (Prince Eric)
- Maria Kowroski (Barbie/Clara)
- Benjamin Millepied
- Nora Y. Mullman
- Abi Stafford
- Yue Nhice Fraile with the dancing princess

== Release ==
=== United States ===
Barbie in the Nutcracker was released on VHS on October 2, 2001, and DVD on October 23, 2001, by Artisan Home Entertainment under the Family Home Entertainment banner. The film was televised on CBS in the United States on November 22, 2001, edited down to a one-hour special. It was later broadcast on Nickelodeon on March 21, 2004.

The DVD includes both widescreen and pan-and-scan versions of the movie. Bonus features on the DVD include a documentary following several girls training to be ballet dancers as the School of American Ballet in New York, and an "Act with Barbie" feature teaching children about positive role playing.

The movie was re-released on DVD by Universal Studios Home Entertainment on October 5, 2010.

=== International ===
In February 2001, Entertainment Rights acquired all international TV and home video rights to the film from Mattel for £1.6 million.

The film was released onto VHS in the United Kingdom by Right Entertainment/Universal Pictures Video on October 29, 2001, being the first product released by the then-new subsidiary. The film would become a commercial success in the UK, selling 100,000 units within its first week of release and 500,000 over the 2001 Christmas period. It was released on DVD on March 25, 2002, and by April, 700,000 copies were sold across both formats.

Entertainment Rights sublicensed the home video rights outside the United Kingdom and Ireland to Universal Pictures Visual Programming in July 2001 as part of a deal that would allow Universal to distribute Right Entertainment products in the UK and Ireland. ER would also pre-sell the TV rights in countries like Germany, France, Italy, Hong Kong, South Korea and Australia by May 2003.

== Reception ==
=== Commercial reception ===
Barbie in the Nutcracker had a 94% sell-through rate and sales of over 3.5 million units on video and DVD. It grossed US $150 million in total sales, including associated merchandise. It was the second most popular children's video of 2001 in the United States, and at the time was the best-selling nonsequel animated premiere title ever.

=== Critical response ===
Caryn James of The New York Times wrote, "the film works well enough according to the undemanding rules of Barbie. With its adventures in fairyland and magical transformations, this is a diverting, inoffensively sweet tale for very small children." Marylin Moss of The Hollywood Reporter praised the film as wholesome entertainment for young girls, writing "Barbie is all gentle and generous and not afraid of a villain or two. The story is strong, the animation splendid and the music and choreography delightful. The entire production is first-rate." A review in Parenting noted the film "explores how self-confidence and kindness can enable girls to realize their dreams".

Peter Dobrin of The Philadelphia Inquirer called Barbie in the Nutcracker a "smart effort" with a "compelling story". R. Pitman of The Video Librarian wrote, "the colorful animation, kid-friendly script, and excellent "highlights" score [...] all make for pleasant family viewing, and the fairy dances (clearly inspired by sequences in Peter Pan and Fantasia) truly sparkle." Calling the film "a perfect dream", Remi Sklar of Video Store Magazine noted educational benefits to children from the classical music and ballet, and wrote that the battle scenes and male characters could make the film appealing to young boys as well as girls.

Rating it 4 out of 5 stars, Rob Lowing of the Sunday Age called it "unexpectedly charming." Scott Hettrick of the South Florida Sun-Sentinel praised the film's story, voice cast and ballet performances, and wrote, "It's hard to imagine any other 76-minute program, let alone any other version of The Nutcracker, that delivers as much adventure, fantasy, romance, humor, suspense, ballet and classical music." Marc D. Allan of the Indianapolis Star rated it 3 stars and called it "extremely impressive". Entertainment Weekly reviewer Eileen Clarke awarded the film a grade of "B Minus", writing that it did not feature as much ballet as she expected.

Other critics were less positive. Joe Leydon of Variety called it a "generic fantasy-adventure", observing similarities to The Wizard of Oz, and wrote, "Pre-adolescent girls may be charmed by sugary sweetness of "Barbie in the Nutcracker." But they shouldn't expect their parents, or even slightly older siblings, to join them for repeated viewings of this made-for-video trifle." While enjoying the "few amusing lines and clever situations", Robert Gottlieb of The New York Observer did not like the film's animation, describing the characters' appearance as "semi-rigid celluloid aliens with glazed expressions and enamel smiles". Jennifer Fisher of The Los Angeles Times felt that the story had been "tamper[ed] too much with", opining that Barbie in the Nutcracker "stray[s] so far from any previous "Nutcracker" story that she might as well have remade "The Wizard of Oz" or called it "Rebecca of Sunnybrook Candy Land.""

Reviewing the film for Common Sense Media, Joly Herman deemed it a "lackluster holiday tale", finding that Clara is a more passive heroine than those in later Barbie movies: "She helps the Nutcracker with some of his tasks, and she stands up to the Mouse King in a scary confrontation, but she's more interested in being the romantic link than the heroic one."

=== Awards ===
- Video Premiere Award for Best Animated Video Premiere Movie — Won (Producers Jesyca C. Durchin and Jennifer Twiner McCarron)
- Video Premiere Award for Best Character Performance — Nominated (Barbie/Clara: voice actress Kelly Sheridan, animation directors Michael Ferraro and Gino Nichele)
- Video Premiere Award for Best Character Performance — Nominated (Pimm: voice actor Peter Kelamis and animator Chris Buckley)

== Merchandise ==
Barbie in the Nutcracker had an extensive product tie-in campaign. Products included a book, eight dolls, a Hallmark Christmas ornament, ballet bags and sleepwear. The toy line included Barbie as Clara/the Sugarplum Princess, Ken as Prince Eric, Kelly and Tommy as their feature characters, and a horse and candy sleigh. The Barbie as Clara and Ken as Prince Eric dolls were available in both Caucasian and African-American models.

== Cultural impact and legacy ==
As the first film of the Barbie animated film franchise, Eleanor Burnard of Collider credited Barbie in the Nutcracker with "kickstart[ing] the Barbie renaissance in the new millennium". It is often ranked by entertainment websites as being among the best films in the franchise.

In 2021, the short film Barbie and the Nutcracker was released on YouTube as part of the Barbie's Dreamworld series to commemorate the film's 20th anniversary.

A remake of the film was released on November 1, 2026, to commemorate its 25th anniversary, with Tim Curry in the role of The Rat King's Father.

== See also ==
- List of Barbie films
- List of films featuring miniature people
- List of Christmas films
