= Christmas (Mannheim Steamroller album) =

Studio album by Mannheim Steamroller
- Released: September 15, 1984
- Recorded: 1984
- Genres: Christmas music, synth-pop, new wave
- Length: 33:01
- Label: American Gramaphone
- Producer: Chip Davis

Mannheim Steamroller chronology
Fresh Aire V (1983)	Christmas (1984)	Fresh Aire VI (1986)

Mannheim Steamroller Christmas albums chronology
Christmas (1984)	A Fresh Aire Christmas (1988)

Professional ratings
Review scores
Source	Rating
AllMusic	4.5/5 stars

Christmas (also known as Mannheim Steamroller Christmas) is the first Christmas album and sixth studio album overall released by American musical group Mannheim Steamroller. It was the band's first album to chart on the Billboard 200 album chart, peaking at No. 110 during its original release but eventually reached No. 50 in 1989 following the success of its follow-up A Fresh Aire Christmas.

On June 21, 2004, the album was certified 6× Platinum by the Recording Industry Association of America for shipment of six million copies in the United States since its 1984 release, making it one of the best-selling Christmas/holiday albums in the U.S.

Seven of the album's 11 tracks were included in the group's 2004 compilation Christmas Celebration.

It is Mannheim Steamroller's second best selling Christmas album (next to A Fresh Aire Christmas), and as of November 2014, it was the seventh best-selling Christmas/holiday album in the U.S. during the Nielsen SoundScan era of music sales tracking (March 1991 – present), having sold a total of 3,500,000 copies during that period according to SoundScan.

2019 marked the 35th anniversary of the album, which was celebrated with special-edition vinyl and compact disc releases.

== Track listing ==
Christmas track listing
No.	Title	Music	Length
1.	"Deck the Halls"	Traditional (Welsh ayre)	3:43
2.	"We Three Kings"	John Hopkins	3:45
3.	"Bring a Torch, Jeanette, Isabella"	Traditional (17th century French)	2:32
4.	"Coventry Carol"	Traditional (16th century English)	2:38
5.	"Good King Wenceslas"	Traditional (English carol)	3:29
6.	"Wassail, Wassail"	Traditional (Ancient English carol)	2:20
7.	"Carol of the Birds"	Traditional (Bas-Quercy)	2:03
8.	"I Saw Three Ships"	Traditional (15th century legend)	1:28
9.	"God Rest Ye Merry, Gentlemen" (Renaissance version (Note: Tracks 6–9 comprise the "Christmas Sweet."))	Traditional (English carol)	1:38
10.	"God Rest Ye Merry, Gentlemen" (rock version)	Traditional (English carol)	4:19
11.	"Stille Nacht"	Franz Gruber	5:26

== Personnel ==
- Louis F. "Chip" Davis Jr. - drums, percussion (including camel bells), recorder, bells, dulcimer, crumhorn, vocals, pencil, dry ice
- Eric Hansen - bass, lute
- Jackson Berkey - Baldwin S-10 piano, Davis harpsichord, clavichord, toy piano, Prophet 5 synthesizer, Fender Rhodes, camel bells, vocals
- Ron Cooley - 6 and 12-string guitars
- Willis Ann Ross - flute
- David "High D" Kappy - French horn
- Mary Walter - harp
- Russell Powell - bass guitar
- String section includes Steve Shipps (concertmaster), Richard Lohmann, Richard Altenbach, Grace Granata, Deborah Fuller, Scott Shoemaker (violins), Michelle Brill, Michael Strauss, Roxanne Adams (violas), David Low, Kim Rockshaw, Greg Clinton (cellos), Wayne Anderson, and Bill Ritchie (double basses)
- Ron Dabbs - camel bells, sound effects engineer
- Louis Davis Sr. - keyboard technician
