= Christmas in the Aire =

Studio album by Mannheim Steamroller
- Released: September 12, 1995
- Recorded: 1994–1995
- Genre: Christmas
- Length: 43:11
- Label: American Gramaphone
- Producer: Chip Davis

Mannheim Steamroller chronology
To Russia with Love (1994)	Christmas in the Aire (1995)	Huskers Muzik (1997)

Mannheim Steamroller Christmas albums chronology
A Fresh Aire Christmas (1988)	Christmas in the Aire (1995)	Mannheim Steamroller Christmas Live (1997)

Professional ratings
Review scores
Source	Rating
Allmusic	4/5 stars

Christmas in the Aire is the third Christmas album and twenty-first studio album released by American musical group Mannheim Steamroller. The album was originally released in 1995, and was the biggest-selling holiday album in the United States that year with sales of 1,844,000 according to Nielsen/SoundScan.

"Christmas Lullaby" was the only track from this album included in the group's 2004 compilation Christmas Celebration. The song was re-recorded in lyrical form for the 2007 album Christmas Song with vocals by Olivia Newton-John.

On December 15, 1997, Christmas in the Aire was certified Quadruple Platinum by the Recording Industry Association of America for shipment of four million copies in the United States.

As of November 2014, Christmas in the Aire is the fifth best-selling Christmas/holiday album in the U.S. during the Nielsen SoundScan era of music sales tracking (March 1991 – present), having sold 3,740,000 copies according to SoundScan. It ranks as Mannheim Steamroller's third best selling Christmas album.

== Track listing ==
Christmas in the Aire track listing
No.	Title	Lyrics	Music	Length
1.	"Joy to the World"		George Frideric Handel	3:36
2.	"Joseph Dear Oh Joseph Mine"		Traditional	3:08
3.	"Rudolph the Red Nosed Reindeer"		Johnny Marks	3:12
4.	"Herbei, oh ihr Gläubigen (O Come, All Ye Faithful)"	Joseph Hermann Mohr	Traditional	3:30
5.	"Patapan"		Bernard de la Monnoye	4:48
6.	"O Little Town of Bethlehem"		Lewis Redner	3:55
7.	"Angels We Have Heard on High"		Traditional	3:53
8.	"Galliarda"		Johann Hermann Schein	3:00
9.	"Los Peces En El Río"		Traditional	3:50
10.	"Christmas Lullaby"		Chip Davis	4:06
11.	"Kling, Glöckchen"	Karl Enslin	Benedikt Widmann	1:46
12.	"Jingle Bells"		James Lord Pierpont	4:28
