= American Gramaphone =

Record company based in Omaha, Nebraska

- Founded: 1974
- Founder: Chip Davis
- Country of origin: U.S.
- Location: Omaha, Nebraska
- Official website: www.mannheimsteamroller.com

American Gramaphone is an American record company based in Omaha, Nebraska. It is best known for releasing Chip Davis's new age solo and Mannheim Steamroller albums.

== History ==
American Gramaphone, formed in 1974 by Chip Davis, has released solo albums by the Mannheim Steamroller musicians Jackson Berkey and Ron Cooley, as well as by the bands America, John Denver, and Checkfield. It publishes not only recordings but also musical compositions, including all of Davis's own (including his work with Bill Fries, who used the alias C. W. McCall)), and is a SESAC affiliate.

== Albums ==
Album	Artist	Series	Release date
Autumn Song	Mannheim Steamroller	Ambience	2003
Bird Song	Mannheim Steamroller	Ambience	2001
Summer Song	Mannheim Steamroller	Ambience	2001
American Spirit	Mannheim Steamroller / C. W. McCall	American Spirit	2003
Mannheim Steamroller Christmas	Mannheim Steamroller	Christmas	1984
A Fresh Aire Christmas	Mannheim Steamroller	Christmas	1988
Christmas in the Aire	Mannheim Steamroller	Christmas	1995
Mannheim Steamroller Christmas Live	Mannheim Steamroller	Christmas	1997
The Christmas Angel: A Family Story	Mannheim Steamroller	Christmas	1998
Christmas Extraordinaire	Mannheim Steamroller	Christmas	2001
Christmas Song by Chip Davis	Mannheim Steamroller	Christmas	2007
Christmas Celebration	Mannheim Steamroller	Christmas	2004
Christmas 25th Anniversary Collection	Mannheim Steamroller	Christmas	2009
Christmas Symphony	Mannheim Steamroller	Christmas	2011
Christmas Symphony II	Mannheim Steamroller	Christmas	2013
Mannheim Steamroller Live	Mannheim Steamroller	Christmas	2015
Dinner	Chip Davis, John Archer	Day Parts	1992
Party	Chip Davis	Day Parts	1993
Party II	Chip Davis	Day Parts	1995
Romance	Chip Davis	Day Parts	1992
Romance II	Chip Davis	Day Parts	1998
Sunday Morning Coffee	Chip Davis	Day Parts	1991
Sunday Morning Coffee II	Chip Davis	Day Parts	1993
Fresh Aire I	Mannheim Steamroller	Fresh Aire	1975
Fresh Aire II	Mannheim Steamroller	Fresh Aire	1977
Fresh Aire III	Mannheim Steamroller	Fresh Aire	1979
Fresh Aire IV	Mannheim Steamroller	Fresh Aire	1981
Fresh Aire V	Mannheim Steamroller	Fresh Aire	1983
Fresh Aire VI	Mannheim Steamroller	Fresh Aire	1987
Fresh Aire 7	Mannheim Steamroller	Fresh Aire	1990
Fresh Aire 8	Mannheim Steamroller	Fresh Aire	2000
Halloween	Mannheim Steamroller	Halloween	2003
Halloween: Monster Mix	Mannheim Steamroller	Halloween	2004
Halloween 2: Creatures Collection	Mannheim Steamroller	Halloween	2006
25 Year Celebration of Mannheim Steamroller	Mannheim Steamroller		1999
Classical Gas	Mason Williams and Mannheim Steamroller		1987
Fresh Aire Interludes	Mannheim Steamroller		1981
Fresh Aire Motivator	Mannheim Steamroller		1998
Impressions	Chip Davis		1993
Mannheim Massage	Mannheim Steamroller		1997
Mannheim Steamroller Meets the Mouse	Mannheim Steamroller		1999
The Real McCall: An American Storyteller	C. W. McCall		1990
Saving the Wildlife	Mannheim Steamroller		1986
To Russia with Love	Mannheim Steamroller		1994
Yellowstone	Mannheim Steamroller		1989
Romantic Melodies	Mannheim Steamroller		2003
Romantic Themes	Mannheim Steamroller		2005
Water, Wind and Stone	Checkfield		1986
Distant Thunder	Checkfield		1987
Through the Lens	Checkfield		1988
A View from the Edge	Checkfield		1990
Brother Sun, Sister Moon	John Rutter & The Cambridge Singers		1990
Unexpected Journeys	Jeff Jenkins		1989
The Ancient and the Infant	Ron Cooley		1988
Rainbows	Ron Cooley		1982
Daydreams	Ron Cooley		1980
Inventions from the Blue Line	Mike Post		1994
Spencer Nilson	Architects of Change		1989

== See also ==
- Music in Omaha, Nebraska
- List of record labels
