= Fresh Aire =

Studio album by Mannheim Steamroller
- Released: January 1, 1975
- Recorded: 1974
- Genre: New-age; symphonic rock
- Length: 33:30
- Label: American Gramaphone
- Producer: Chip Davis, Don Sears

Mannheim Steamroller chronology
Fresh Aire (1975)	Fresh Aire II (1977)

Professional ratings
Review scores
Source	Rating
Allmusic	3/5 stars

Fresh Aire is the first album by new-age musical group Mannheim Steamroller. It was originally released in 1975.

== Background ==
The record was followed by seven additional albums in the Fresh Aire series. The album contains twelve tracks, each sequentially aligned with a month of the year. Each of the next three Fresh Aire albums is based upon a season, which later led to Fresh Aire's theme being reimagined as Spring.

Besides the eponymous seventh tune, several of the track names are played on musical terms denoting the form of that song. The title track "Fresh Aire" is an air, "Saras Band" is a sarabande, and "Pass the Keg (Lia)" is a passacaglia. Composer Chip Davis refers to his music as "18th century rock and roll."

== Track listing ==
All tracks are written by Chip Davis.

No.	Title	Length
1.	"Prelude"	1:33
2.	"Chocolate Fudge"	2:54
3.	"Interlude I"	2:55
4.	"Sonata"	2:32
5.	"Interlude II"	2:33
6.	"Saras Band"	3:37
7.	"Fresh Aire"	5:30
8.	"Rondo"	2:36
9.	"Interlude III"	2:36
10.	"Pass the Keg (Lia)"	2:33
11.	"Interlude IV"	2:11
12.	"Mist"	1:47
Total length:		33:30

== Personnel ==
- Chip Davis – drums, percussion, recorder
- Eric Hansen – bass
- Jackson Berkey – keyboards
- Don Sears – synthesizer programming, string arrangements
- Bill Buntain – trombone on "Pass the Keg"
- Denny Schneider – trumpet on "Pass the Keg"
- Mortimer Alpert, Dorothy Brown, Hugh Brown, Miriam Duffelmeyer, Ginny Eldred, Lucinda Gladics, James Hammond, Jean Hassel, Joe Landes, Karl Lyon, Bob Malec, Beth McCollum, Virginia Moriarty, Dorothy Redina, Joe Rosenstein, Merton Shatzkin, Alex Sokol, Jess Stern, Larry Sutton, Paul Todd – strings on "Sonata", "Fresh Aire", and "Mist"

== Production ==
- Produced By Chip Davis & Don Sears
- Recorded & Engineered By Jeff Schiller, Don Sears & Ron Ubel
