= Mannheim Steamroller =

American neoclassical new-age music band

- Origin: Omaha, Nebraska
- Genres: Neoclassical new-age music; holiday
- Years active: 1974–present
- Label: American Gramaphone
- Members: Chip Davis; Roxanne Layton; Becky Kia-Mills; Mark Angor; Tom Sharpe; Ed Berry; Anna Lackaff; David Plank; Chris Forte; Tom Vitacco; Reed Flygt; Mark Nelson; Timothy Schneider; (Many Others) (Note: Mannheim Steamroller also enlists a rolling roster of touring musicians who change every year. The musicians listed above are recording artists of Mannheim Steamroller who are also touring with the ensemble.)
- Past members: Jackson Berkey; Bobby Jenkins; Almeda Berkey; Eric Hansen; Carol Scott; Milt Bailey; David Kappy; Steve Shipps; Ron Cooley; Russ Powell; Arnie Roth; Chuck Penington; Jonathan Swoboda; Joey Gulizia; Jeff Yang; Christy Crowl; Bobby Kunkle; Paul Mutzabaugh; Johnny Adams; Zachary Adamson; Brian Czach
- Website: MannheimSteamroller.com

Mannheim Steamroller is an American neoclassical new-age music ensemble founded and directed by percussionist/composer Chip Davis in 1974. The group is known primarily for its Fresh Aire series of albums, which blend classical music with elements of new age and rock, and for its modern recordings of Christmas music. The group has sold 28 million albums in the U.S. alone.

== History ==
=== Beginnings ===
Mannheim Steamroller began as an alias for record producer and composer Chip Davis. The name "Mannheim Steamroller" comes from an 18th-century German musical technique, Mannheim roller (German: Mannheimer Walze), a crescendo passage having a rising melodic line over an ostinato bass line, popularized by the Mannheim school of composition.

Before the fame of Steamroller, Davis had been best known for collaborating with his friend Bill Fries on the songs of the country music character "C. W. McCall", of "Convoy" fame. The song was based on the character created by Fries and music composed by Davis for a series of Clio winning ads for Metz Baking Company for their Old Home Bread product. Davis was named 1976's Country Music Writer of the Year, a genre he is not fond of.

Even before the height of McCall's popularity, Davis produced an unusual album of classical music performed entirely by Davis and musical collaborator and keyboardist Jackson Berkey, using electric bass (played by Eric Hansen) and synthesizers.

=== Fresh Aire and American Gramaphone ===
Since no major label would handle the distribution of Fresh Aire, Davis founded his own music label, American Gramaphone (a play on the German classical record label Deutsche Grammophon), to release the album, which was published in 1975 under the pseudonym Mannheim Steamroller. Fresh Aire II was subsequently released in 1977, and Fresh Aire III was released in 1979. The first four Fresh Aire albums constituted an exploration of the four seasons, with Fresh Aire being spring, Fresh Aire II being fall, Fresh Aire III being summer, and Fresh Aire IV being winter. All four of these albums maintained the blend of baroque classical music, light jazz, and rock and featured Jackson Berkey's virtuosic keyboard work. Davis and Berkey used whatever instrument seemed appropriate to the piece, using a toy piano on one piece and a full pipe organ on another, with copious interleaving of piano and harpsichord. In 1981 Davis released Fresh Aire Interludes, an album that compiled Berkey's ten piano interludes from the first four Fresh Aire albums.

Davis then moved into exploring some other themes, with Fresh Aire V subtitled "To the Moon", Fresh Aire VI exploring Greek mythology, Fresh Aire 7 based on the number 7, and Fresh Aire 8 based on the theme of infinity. A live tour of the early albums featured a prominent light show and multimedia components, along with spoken poetry by Almeda Berkey. While the music was slightly different from the album versions, it was played in lockstep at each show, as it had to coordinate the live musicians with recorded tracks of strings and other orchestral parts.

In 1986, Mannheim Steamroller released music composed for a PBS special called Saving the Wildlife, which featured one track from Fresh Aire VI and twelve new tracks. In 1987, Davis collaborated with guitarist/composer Mason Williams for the album Classical Gas. The music was composed entirely by Williams but produced and arranged by Davis. The album opens with a remake of Williams' 1968 instrumental "Classical Gas", which used the original arrangement.

=== Christmas music success ===
Steamroller found its greatest fame beginning in 1984 when Davis released his first holiday album, Mannheim Steamroller Christmas, featuring modern contemporary interpretations of Yuletide favorites. This was followed by A Fresh Aire Christmas in 1988.

Steamroller's Christmas music caught the ear of American talk radio host Rush Limbaugh when it was used as bumper music for football games toward the end of the NFL season around the holidays. In turn, he began using it as bumper music on his radio show during the holiday season. As a result, Mannheim Steamroller found a whole new audience among conservatives, and became one of the most requested Christmas music artists of all time.

Steamroller released Christmas in the Aire in 1995. Like its two predecessors, it showcased creative approaches to old carols, as well as some new carol-like compositions. At the end of 1997, they released a live album of Christmas music, Mannheim Steamroller Christmas Live. Their fourth all-new Christmas album, Christmas Extraordinaire, was released in 2001. While Steamroller's third and fourth Christmas releases sold well, they fell short of the sales of Christmas and A Fresh Aire Christmas. Christmas Celebration, a compilation of favorite tracks from the previous studio albums (with one new song), was released in 2004.

The studio album Christmas Song was released in late 2007 and features guest vocals by Johnny Mathis and Olivia Newton-John (on a remake of "Christmas Lullaby" from their third Christmas album). Steamroller co-founder Jackson Berkey is absent from the lineup. The CD Christmasville was released in 2008. Their next release was a 25th anniversary Christmas box set consisting of previously released material, and in 2011 they released Mannheim Steamroller Christmas Symphony with members of the Czech Philharmonic Orchestra.

Mannheim Steamroller's top nine best selling albums are all Christmas albums.

=== Other work ===
Musically, as the 1990s progressed, Davis moved into the mainstream of "progressive rock" music with a heavier reliance on synthesized instruments and less humor. Titles like "Small Wooden Bach'ses" from Fresh Aire III were not seen, nor mechanisms like the creative use of a cricket on the same album or the Gregorian chant on Fresh Aire II. Davis's music became closer to the "light jazz" style that gained prominence in the 1990s, especially with the Day Parts albums.

Steamroller developed a full-length theatrical motion picture based on their Christmas albums, but the plans for production fell through. Instead, the following year, they collaborated with Olivia Newton-John for yet another Christmas album called The Christmas Angel: A Family Story, a mostly spoken-word recording scored with previously released material. The story was then turned into a figure skating production titled The Christmas Angel: A Story on Ice, starring Dorothy Hamill as the mother, Daniel Cloonan as the son, Elvis Stojko as the Gargon, and Tonia Kwiatkowski in the title role of the Angel. In 2003 they released a CD titled Halloween.

In addition to their Fresh Aire and Christmas collections, Steamroller has released: an album of Disney music (1999's Mannheim Steamroller Meets the Mouse); an album celebrating American heritage, (2003's American Spirit, which reunited Davis with C.W. McCall and featured a remake of "Convoy"); and an album Yellowstone: The Music of Nature, for the PBS special of the same name, mixing prior Davis compositions and a series of classical pieces by Ottorino Respighi and others.

During some holiday seasons, fans can listen to Chip narrate two special radio programs, “The Twelve Days of Christmas” and “An American Christmas” on Kim Komando's WestStar network. “12 Days” airs in the days leading up to Christmas and, on some stations, Christmas Eve. “An American Christmas” airs on Christmas Eve on most stations. In 2024, this expanded to a full Internet radio channel on Sirius XM Radio's online apps.!

In 2008, Davis underwent surgery, which prevented him from touring or performing with the band. Rather than ultimately force the tour to stop while he recovered, Davis opted to hire additional musicians to replace him. He also decided to create two different lineups of the band, nicknamed the "red" and "green" touring companies which allows the band to reach more cities on their annual Christmas tour.

The group appeared in the 2011 and 2013 Macy's Thanksgiving Day Parade, playing their version of "Deck the Halls."

A new album composed and performed in the design of the Fresh Aire series, Exotic Spaces, was set for release in March 2018. The album features songs that were inspired by famous global sites, such as Egypt's pyramids and the Taj Mahal. The album blends global instruments with the group’s signature drums, harpsichord, and synthesizers. The album was officially released in September 2019, prior to the 2019 Christmas tour.

== Discography ==
=== Fresh Aire series albums ===
Year	Album	Peak chart positions		RIAA certification
Year	Album	New Age Albums^{1}	Billboard 200 Albums	RIAA certification
1975	Fresh Aire			Gold
1977	Fresh Aire II			Gold
1979	Fresh Aire III			Gold
1981	Fresh Aire IV			Gold
1981	Fresh Aire Interludes (compilation)			----
1983	Fresh Aire V	25 (1994)		Gold
1986	Fresh Aire VI		155	Gold
1990	Fresh Aire 7	2	77	Gold
1993	Seasons: A Fresh Aire Collection (box set compilation of the first four Fresh Aire albums)			----
1993	Fresh Aire Music Motivator (compilation)			----
2000	Fresh Aire 8	2		----
2007	The Fresh Aire Music of Mannheim Steamroller (compilation)			----

=== Christmas albums ===
Year	Album	Peak chart positions			RIAA certification
Year	Album	New Age Albums^{1}	Holiday Albums^{2}	Billboard 200 Albums	RIAA certification
1984	Christmas	8	2	50	6× Platinum
1988	A Fresh Aire Christmas	4	1	36	6× Platinum
1995	Christmas in the Aire	1	1	3	4× Platinum
1997	Christmas Live	1	1	24	Platinum
1997	My Little Christmas Tree & Other Christmas Bedtime Stories (book included music CD)				----
1998	The Christmas Angel: A Family Story	1	2	25	Platinum
2001	Christmas Extraordinaire	1	1	5	3× Platinum
2001	Christmas Collection (box set compilation)				----
2004	Christmas Celebration (compilation)	1	1	19	Platinum
2006	Winter Wonderland (compilation)				----
2007	Christmas Song	1	2	5	Platinum
2007	Trimming the Tree (compilation)				----
2007	Morning Frost (compilation)				----
2007	Mannheim Steamroller the Making of Christmas Song By Chip Davis				----
2008	Sweet Memories (compilation)				----
2008	A Candle Light Christmas (compilation)	1	8	68	----
2008	Christmasville	2	8	48	----
2009	Christmas: 25th Anniversary Collection (compilation)	1	6	29	Gold
2010	Heading Home (compilation)				----
2011	Christmas Symphony	1	2	19	----
2011	Hometown (compilation)				----
2011	Mannheim Ultimate Christmas Collection (box set compilation)				----
2012	Tis the Season (compilation)				----
2013	Christmas Symphony II (release and a special extended version)		2	26	----
2014	30/40				----
2015	LIVE (release and a special extended version)			85	----
2019	Christmas 35th Anniversary				

=== Chip Davis – Christmas albums ===
Year	Album	Peak chart positions			RIAA certification
Year	Album	New Age Albums^{1}	Holiday Albums^{2}	Billboard 200 Albums	RIAA certification
1996	Chip Davis' Holiday Musik				----
1997	Chip Davis' Holiday Musik II				----
1998	Chip Davis Presents: Renaissance Holiday				----

=== Halloween albums ===
Year	Album	Peak chart positions		RIAA certification
Year	Album	New Age Albums^{1}	Billboard 200 Albums	RIAA certification
2003	Halloween	1	53	----
2004	Halloween: Monster Mix			----
2006	Halloween 2 Creatures Collection			----
2006	Halloween: Sweet Tooth (compilation)			----

=== Ambience series albums ===
Year	Album	Peak chart positions		RIAA certification
Year	Album	New Age Albums^{1}	Billboard 200 Albums	RIAA certification
2000	Ambience: Bird Song			----
2001	Ambience: Summer Song			----
2003	Ambience: Autumn Song			----
Mentioned in the existing CD liner notes are Ambience Ocean Song, Ambience Night Song and Ambience Desert Song; this series was apparently abandoned before their release.

=== Chip Davis – Day Parts series and solo albums ===
Year	Album	Peak chart positions		RIAA certification
Year	Album	New Age Albums^{1}	Billboard 200 Albums	RIAA certification
1991	Day Parts: Sunday Morning Coffee			----
1992	Chip Davis' Day Parts: Dinner			----
1992	Chip Davis' Day Parts: Party Music That Cooks			----
1992	Chip Davis' Day Parts: Romance			----
1993	Impressions			----
1994	Chip Davis' Day Parts: Sunday Morning Coffee II			----
1995	Chip Davis' Day Parts: Party Music That Cooks 2			----
1998	Chip Davis' Day Parts: Romance II			----

=== Other albums ===
Year	Album	Peak chart positions		RIAA certification
Year	Album	New Age Albums^{1}	Billboard 200 Albums	RIAA certification
1980	American Gramaphone Sampler (compilation)			----
1984	American Gramaphone Sampler III (compilation)			----
1986	Saving the Wildlife (1986 television documentary soundtrack)			----
1987	Classical Gas			Gold
1987	American Gramaphone Sampler (compilation)			----
1989	Yellowstone: The Music of Nature	2	167	Gold
1990	American Gramaphone Sampler 2 (compilation)			----
1994	To Russia with Love	9		----
1996	Huskers Musik			----
1997	A Mannheim Massage (compilation)			----
1998	In the Deed the Glory			----
1999	Mannheim Steamroller Meets the Mouse	1	89	----
1999	25 Year Celebration of Mannheim Steamroller (compilation)			----
2000	Exclusive Collection (compilation)			----
2003	Romantic Melodies	1	41	----
2003	American Spirit			----
2005	Romantic Themes			----
2007	The Music of the Spheres			----
2010	True Wilderness			----
2012	Safari (re-release of Saving the Wildlife)			----
2013	Snapshot: Mannheim Steamroller (compilation)			----
2013	The Music of the Spheres (re-release, added five tracks, removed one)			----
2015	Live (live performance compilation)		85	----
2019	Exotic Spaces (featuring 12 new tracks)			----

^{1} Billboard's Top New Age Albums chart became the New Age Albums chart in June 2009. ^{2} Billboard's Top Holiday Albums chart became the Holiday Albums chart in June 2009.

== See also ==
- Hooked on Classics
- List of ambient music artists
- List of best-selling music artists
- Trans-Siberian Orchestra
- The Wizards of Winter
