= Arnie Roth =

American classical composer

Arnold Roth
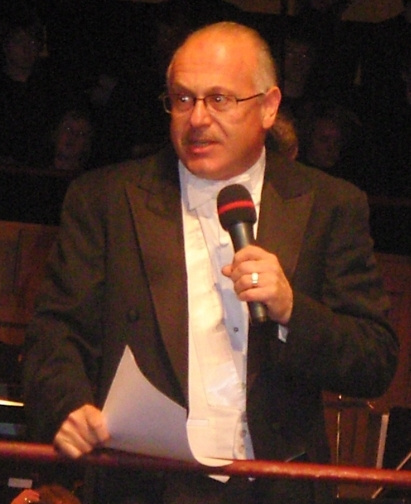
- Roth at a Play! A Video Game Symphony event in 2007
- Born: April 28, 1953 (age 72)
- Occupations: Conductor, composer
- Children: 3

Arnold "Arnie" Roth (born April 28, 1953) is an American conductor, composer, and record producer, known for his expansive career in the music industry. Roth began his career as a professional violinist before founding AWR Music, where Roth became more involved as a producer of orchestral concerts and recordings. Roth is perhaps best known as the co-creator (along with composer Nobuo Uematsu) and Music Director of Distant Worlds: music from FINAL FANTASY, produced in collaboration with the video game company Square Enix. Distant Worlds has performed hundreds of sold-out concerts around the world and has produced seven full-length albums of orchestral Final Fantasy music. Roth's son Eric (born 1977) is also a famed conductor.

== Career ==
Roth is a classically trained violinist. As a freelance violinist in Chicago throughout the '70s and '80s, Roth worked with dozens of notable musicians and bands like Styx, Curtis Mayfield, and the Chi-Lites. He was also a performing member of the Grammy Award-winning music group Mannheim Steamroller for decades. In the early 2000s, Roth composed, arranged, and conducted the music for eight of Mattel's sixteen animated Barbie movies. He won the Best Score Award at the 2003 DVD Premier Awards for his soundtrack to the film Barbie as Rapunzel and was nominated for an Emmy Award in 2007 for his original song "Shine" from Barbie in the 12 Dancing Princesses.

Roth, a long-time member of the Chicago music scene, was frequently asked to assist in contracting local talent. Roth created AWR Music in 2000. It is headquartered in Chicago, Illinois. The company has two components, AWR Music and AWR Music Productions, which focus on contracting talent and concert production, respectively. While concert productions became more prominent as Roth's collaboration with Square Enix grew, the company continues to source and hire local talent from locations all around the world.

Roth has worked with several notable artists, including Andrea Bocelli, Diana Ross, Il Divo, Jewel, Josh Groban, Charlotte Church, Patrick Stewart, Peter Cetera, Pat Benatar, Dennis DeYoung, and others. He has conducted the London Symphony Orchestra, National Symphony, Royal Stockholm Philharmonic, Los Angeles Philharmonic, Houston Symphony, San Francisco Symphony, Tokyo Philharmonic, San Diego Symphony, and the Sydney Symphony.

=== Collaboration with Square Enix ===
The seed of Roth's collaboration with Square Enix was planted in 2004. Roth, looking for interesting music programming, had a colleague suggest he research video game music. In 2005, he worked on the first public performance of Dear Friends - Music from FINAL FANTASY, where he met his long-time collaborator, Nobuo Uematsu. Roth mentioned in an interview that Uematsu "knew everything about me before I even shook his hand." Roth's work with Square Enix continued to grow, culminating in Distant Worlds, a licensed production notable for being the first international tour of video game music. Roth's company continues to produce concerts in collaboration with Square Enix. Roth has played video games but does not identify himself as a gamer. He has stated his appreciation for video game fans and their behavior at concerts, as well as expressing his respect for how video game music has impacted the general music scene.

== Composer credits ==
- Barbie in the Nutcracker (2001)
- Barbie as Rapunzel (2002)
- Barbie of Swan Lake (2003)
- Barbie as the Princess and the Pauper (2004)
- Barbie and the Magic of Pegasus (2005)
- Barbie in the 12 Dancing Princesses (2006)
- Barbie as the Island Princess (2007)
- Barbie & the Diamond Castle (2008)

== Selected credits ==
- 1979 - Styx, Cornerstone (Strings, String Arrangements)
- 1989 - Mannheim Steamroller, Yellowstone: The Music of Nature (Violinist/Concert Master)
- 1990 - Mannheim Steamroller, Fresh Aire 7 (Violinist/Concert Master)
  - Grammy winner, Best New Age Album, 1991
- 1990 - Kym Mazelle, BRILLIANT! (Strings)
- 1993 - Mannheim Steamroller, A Fresh Aire Christmas (Violinist)
- 2001 - George Vosburgh, Trumpet Masterworks (Producer)
- 2003 - Irish Tenors, We Three Kings (Producer)
- 2003 - Pittsburgh Symphony Brass, Spirit of Christmas (Producer)
- 2004 - George Vosburgh, Trumpeters Heritage: Classics for Trumpets and Orchestra (Producer/Conductor/Violinist)
- 2007 - Ronan Tynan, I'll Be Home For Christmas (Producer/Conductor)

== Awards/Nominations ==
Daytime Emmy Awards
Year	Nominated work	Category	Results
2007	"Shine" from Barbie in the 12 Dancing Princesses	Outstanding Original Song - Children's/Animated	Nominated

DVD Exclusive Awards
Year	Nominated work	Category	Results
2003	Barbie as Rapunzel	Best Original Score	Winner
2003	"Rapunzel's Theme" from Barbie as Rapunzel	Best Original Song	Nominated
2003	"Constant as the Stars Above" from Barbie as Rapunzel	Best Original Song	Nominated
2005	Barbie as the Princess and the Pauper	Best Original Score	Nominated
