= Jackson Berkey =

American composer, pianist and singer

- Born: May 24, 1942 (age 84); Huntingdon, Pennsylvania, U.S.
- Genres: Classical, synthetic pop
- Occupations: Composer, pianist, singer
- Instrument: Piano
- Years active: 1969–present
- Labels: American Gramophone, SDG Press
- Website: www.berkey.com

Jackson Berkey (born May 24, 1942) is an American composer, pianist and singer, best known for his work with Mannheim Steamroller, which he co-founded with Chip Davis in 1974.

== Early life and education ==
Berkey was born in Huntingdon, Pennsylvania. He began playing the piano at age 5. His mother learned to play the piano by ear, but insisted that Jackson receive the training she had not. As a result, he was quite an accomplished pianist by the time he entered high school. He received a scholarship from the Huntingdon Music Club to attend the Chautauqua Music Festival in western New York state where he displayed his very serious demeanor as a musician. While his fellow students were enjoying the great outdoors that the area provided, Berkey was daily attending orchestra rehearsals of the Chautauqua Symphony Orchestra.

After graduating from high school in 1960, Berkey briefly attended the Eastman School of Music in Rochester, New York. Unfortunately, because scholarships did not adequately cover all expenses, he dropped out of school and got a job as a programming director and announcer at the classical music station, WBBF-FM in Rochester. He kept up with his piano skills by keeping a keyboard in the announcer's booth with him while working at the radio station. Weekly calls to schedule somewhat irregular sessions with his teacher at Eastman, Orazio Frugoni, allowed the continuation of Berkey's piano study and development as a musician.

Berkey eventually returned to college studies, but this time at Wilkes College in Wilkes-Barre, Pennsylvania, where he earned a bachelor's degree in piano performance. At the urging of a friend, he auditioned for the Juilliard School of Music, and was accepted into their graduate program. He received a master's degree in piano performance from Juilliard in 1968 after several years of study with the accomplished Russian pianist and American pedagogue, Josef Raieff. Berkey's studies were greatly enriched during this time of study with Raieff, who himself studied with Leshetitsky (a pupil of Franz Liszt) and Artur Schnabel (whose lineage can be traced back to Beethoven).

== Career ==
=== Pre-Mannheim Steamroller ===
Berkey was able to pull together enough money to make his professional debut at the Town Hall in New York City in 1969, about which Allen Hughes of the New York Times had this to say: “Mr. Berkey is an accomplished performer and more often than not a persuasive one. His interpretation of the Beethoven Sonata in D major, Op. 10, No. 3 was expertly and sensitively shaped.”

=== Mannheim Steamroller ===
After this recital, Berkey had several jobs, including as a pianist on the Norman Luboff Choir tour. There he met Almeda, his future wife, and Chip Davis. Davis was experimenting with a new style of music, something he called "18th-century rock," but the piano parts he was writing were well outside of his skill as a pianist. The two became fast friends, and the music they were working on would evolve into the album Fresh Aire. They released it under the pseudonym "Mannheim Steamroller" as a play on the phrase "Mannheim roller," an ascending arpeggio named for the late 18th century Mannheim school of music.

Over the next three decades, Mannheim Steamroller released over 30 different albums, including 11 albums of Christmas songs.

=== Solo work ===
After Berkey had moved to Omaha in 1974, he and Almeda wed. She soon became the director of choral activities at the University of Nebraska at Omaha, and later, with her husband, founded Nebraska's Professional Chorale, Soli Deo Gloria Cantorum. Berkey's earliest compositions were original choral works and arrangements for Almeda's choirs, which they performed and recorded together. Many of Berkey's earlier compositions are songs, service cantatas, and other works for vocal ensembles of men, women, and mixed choirs. During the ensuing years from 1980 onward, Jackson has been writing in all genres, including major works for chorus and orchestra, a Piano Concerto, a Harp Concerto, an Organ Concerto, and many works for small chamber ensemble. Greatly inspired by the work of Phillip Erklen and his International Music Syndicate, Berkey has written numerous solo piano works inspired by the East Coast of the U.S. including Cape May Preludes, Cape May Solitudes and Atlantic Fantasy; and others inspired by the West Coast (Olympic Peninsula). Following in the footsteps of J.S.Bach, Frederic Chopin, and Dimitri Shostakovitch, he has written 24 Nocturnes, one in each major and minor key, as well as Four Nocturnes for Orchestra.

== Solo discography ==
- Sunken Cathedral (1978)
- Fresh Aire Interludes (1981; compilation of Berkey-performed interludes from the first four Fresh Aire albums)
- Ballade (1983)
- 109 (1989)
- Berkey Meets Horowitz on the 503 (1994; performed on Vladimir Horowitz's Steinway CD-503 piano)
- Atlantic Fantasy (2007)
- Cape May Preludes (2007)
- 21st Century Romantic (2009)
