= Chip Davis =

American rock musician and composer

- Born: Louis F. Davis Jr. September 5, 1947 (age 78); Hamler, Ohio, United States
- Genres: Rock, classical, country
- Occupations: Musician, songwriter
- Instruments: Piano, bassoon, percussion
- Member of: Mannheim Steamroller

Louis F. "Chip" Davis Jr. (born September 5, 1947) is the founder and leader of the music group Mannheim Steamroller. Davis composed the music for several C. W. McCall albums, including the hit 1975 song "Convoy". He has also written and made other albums, such as Day Parts, and has written several books.

== Early life ==
Louis F. Davis was born in Hamler, Ohio. His family later moved to Portland, Ohio, and, when Davis was 11, to Sylvania, Ohio. He began piano lessons at age 4 and had composed his first piece of music at age 6. He graduated from Sylvania High School and went on to graduate from the University of Michigan School of Music, specializing in bassoon and percussion and playing in the University of Michigan Symphony Band. Davis's parents both attended the university, and his father played clarinet in the band.

== Career ==
After touring with the Norman Luboff Choir, he took a job with Omaha, Nebraska, advertising agency Bozell & Jacobs, Inc. writing jingles. These included spots for a local company, Metz Bakery, featuring the fictional trucker C. W. McCall. The spots were co-written with the advertising writer William Fries, who became the voice of McCall. The spots were so popular that Davis and Fries were persuaded to begin writing non-advertising songs featuring McCall. The song "Convoy" reached number 1 on the Billboard Hot 100 the week of January 10, 1976, using CB slang during the CB/trucker fad. The duo released five albums between 1974 and 1979. Davis was named SESAC Country Music Writer of the Year in 1976.

Davis founded Mannheim Steamroller with Jackson Berkey in 1974 to showcase his interest in fusing modern popular and classical techniques. The first album, Fresh Aire, was completed shortly after. It was turned down by major record labels, so Davis founded American Gramaphone to release it. American Gramaphone has been the label for all subsequent Mannheim Steamroller releases. Eight Fresh Aire albums were released, concluding with Fresh Aire 8 in 2000.

Mannheim Steamroller released Mannheim Steamroller Christmas in 1984; Davis is credited with revolutionizing the "traditional" sounds of Christmas. The group's subsequent Christmas music albums have sold tens of millions of copies and become among the most popular recordings in that genre. His annual Mannheim Steamroller Christmas concert tour, utilizing two cover bands that tour simultaneously, has continued for over 25 years across the US. Davis was awarded his 19th gold record in 2010. The Recording Industry Association of America has also awarded Davis four multi-platinum and eight platinum records. Davis also hosts a once-a-year, 24-hour Christmas music and story radio program called An American Christmas. The program is produced by WestStar Multimedia and broadcast on December 24–25 over hundreds of radio stations.

== Discography ==
As Chip Davis

- Sunday Morning Coffee (1991)
- Party: Music That Cooks (1992)
- Dinner (1992)
- Romance (1992)
- Impressions (1993)
- Sunday Morning Coffee II (1994)
- Party 2 (1995)
- Holiday Musik (1996)
- Holiday Musik II (1997)
- Romance II (1997)
- Chip Davis Presents: Renaissance Holiday (1998)

As Mannheim Steamroller

- see Mannheim Steamroller
