= From Russia with Love =

From Russia with Love may refer to:

== James Bond ==
- From Russia, with Love (novel), 1957 novel by Ian Fleming
- From Russia with Love (film), 1963 film based on the novel
  - From Russia with Love (soundtrack) or its title song
- From Russia with Love (video game), based on the novel and film

== Music ==
- From Russia with Love (Tori Amos album) (2010)
- From Russia with Love (Cold War album) (2004)

== Literature ==
- From Russia with Love, 2001 novel by Colleen Coble
- From Russia with Love: Joseph Brodsky in English, 2002 memoir by Daniel Weissbort
- From Russia, with Love, 2007 novel by Ingrid Weaver
- "From Russia with Love", short story featured in Otherworld Nights by Kelley Armstrong

== Television ==
- Lupin III: From Siberia with Love, a 1992 animated television special known in Japan as From Russia with Love
- "From Russia with Love", Beggars and Choosers season 2, episode 19 (2001)
- "From Russia with Love", Braxton Family Values season 1, episode 5 (2011)
- "From Russia with Love", Doctors (2000) series 2, episode 41 (2000)
- "From Russia with Love", Family (1976) season 4, episode 22 (1979)
- "From Russia with Love", Family Guy season 21, episode 19 (2023)
- "From Russia with Love", HeartBeat (1988) season 2, episode 9 (1989)
- "From Russia with Love", Hockey Wives season 3, episode 5 (2017)
- "From Russia with Love", Humble Politiciann Nograj episode 10 (2022)
- "From Russia with Love", It's a Living season 3, episode 7 (1985)
- "From Russia with Love", Magpakailanman (second incarnation) 2021 season, episode 29 (2021)
- "From Russia with Love", Melissa & Joey season 2, episode 14 (2012)
- "From Russia, with Love", Salvation season 1, episode 8 (2017)
- "From Russia with Love", Stingers season 7, episode 39 (2004)
- "From Russia with Love", The Circus: Inside the Greatest Political Show on Earth season 1, episode 23 (2016)
- "From Russia with Love", The Facts of Life season 3, episode 8 (1981)
- "From Russia with Love", Traders season 1, episode 6 (1996)
- "From Russia with Love", Unhappily Ever After season 3, episode 18 (1997)
- "From Russia with Love", USA High season 1, episode 70 (1998)
- "From Russia with Love with Senpai", Teekyu season 1, episode 7 (2012)

== Other uses ==
- Anastasia Dobromyslova or From Russia with Love (born 1984), Russian darts player

== See also ==
- To Russia with Love (disambiguation)
- From the Fatherland, with Love, a 2005 alternate history novel by Ryū Murakami
- "To Russia with Love", a 2014 single by Courtney Act
- McVan's To Russia With Love, a Scottish Terrier show dog, Best in Show at Crufts in 2015
- "From Russia Without Love", a 2018 episode of The Simpsons
