= To Russia with Love =

To Russia with Love may refer to:

- To Russia with Love (2014 film), LGBTQ documentary
- To Russia With Love (2022 film), Philippine romantic comedy
- To Russia with Love (album), 1994 album by Mannheim Steamroller

== See also ==
- From Russia with Love (disambiguation)
