= List of Melissa & Joey episodes =

Melissa & Joey is an American television sitcom starring Melissa Joan Hart and Joey Lawrence. The series revolves around Melanie "Mel" Burke (Hart), an up-and-coming local politician who hires Joseph "Joe" Longo (Lawrence), a recently divorced commodities broker, as the nanny for her niece and nephew. The series premiered on August 17, 2010, on ABC Family.

Melissa & Joey stood as Wednesday's No.1 cable TV telecast at 8 o'clock in Adults 18–34, Women 18–34, Women 18–49 and Females 12–34 Demographics. Season 2 also dominated its cable time period, ranking No.1 across key measures Adults 18–34, Women 18–34, Adults 18–49, Women 18–49, Viewers 12–34 and Females 12–34.

On February 9, 2015, ABC Family decided to end the show after four seasons and a total of 104 episodes for the series. The series finale aired on August 5, 2015.

== Series overview ==
Season	Episodes		Originally released	
Season	Episodes		First released	Last released
1	30	12	August 17, 2010	October 26, 2010
1	30	18	June 29, 2011	September 14, 2011
2	15		May 30, 2012	August 29, 2012
3	37		May 29, 2013	June 18, 2014
4	22	12	October 22, 2014	March 18, 2015
4	22	10	June 3, 2015	August 5, 2015

== Episodes ==
=== Season 1 (2010–11) ===
No. overall	No. in season	Title	Directed by	Written by	Original release date	Prod. code	US viewers (millions)
Part 1
1	1	"Pilot"	Ted Wass	David Kendall & Bob Young	August 17, 2010	1001	2.15
Melanie "Mel" Burke is having trouble with her niece, Lennox. As she tries to juggle being a councillor and a guardian, she gets a little overwhelmed. Her assistant, Rhonda, suggests she get a nanny. Mel is hesitant to do so until she finds out Lennox wrote a poem about her principal, Miss Lunt (Vernee Watson), that wasn't so nice. Mel relents and decides to hire a nanny. Before leaving for a meeting, Joseph "Joe" Longo knocks on her door. He apologizes for an outburst (seen earlier in the episode) and asks if she can get him a job. Mel realizes he was the head of her brother-in-law's company. (It is mentioned that her brother-in-law ran off leaving the company in disarray and it is implied that he ran off with the millions Joe made for him and left his wife to take the blame. The result is her being in federal prison and the reason for the children having to stay with Mel.) She explains that there is a hiring freeze downtown so she can't get him a job. Joe then offers to be her new nanny. Joe takes Ryder to school so Mel won't miss her meeting. Mel comes home later to take Lennox to school so she can apologize to Miss Lunt. If she doesn't apologize, Lennox cannot go back to school. Mel finds that Ryder is still at home and Lennox is gone. After leaving, Joe sees an online posting from Lennox and realizes she is on the roof. He convinces her to go eat her "big bowl of stink" instead of letting Mel eat it for her. Mel comes back impressed until she finds out Joe paid Lennox fifty dollars to go to the school and apologize to the principal. They later decide to give him a try being the nanny.
2	2	"Moving On"	Ted Wass	David Kendall & Bob Young	August 17, 2010	1002	2.18
Joe moves into Mel's basement with a meager amount of his belongings, with his ex-wife having kept most of the good stuff. Mel then convinces him to stand up for himself and get back his widescreen TV. But the presence of television in the living room ruins Mel's date with a fellow politician (Philipp Karner). Meanwhile, Mel encourages Lennox to make friends at her new school.
3	3	"Nanny Love"	Ted Wass	Seth Kurland	August 24, 2010	1004	1.92
Joe's newfound job ruins his dating life. Soon, though things start heating up with Liz, a sorority sister (Maïté Schwartz) of Mel's. Mel offers him some advice: lie. The truth becomes outrageously stretched, until it blows up in the dysfunctional family's face.
4	4	"Boy Toys 'R' Us"	Ted Wass	Jennifer Glickman	August 31, 2010	1003	1.60
Lennox's new relationship with a bad boy is no concern for her Aunt Mel, who becomes involved with a bartender/musician (Hal Ozsan). With the girls no longer thinking clearly, Joe must talk some sense into Mel, while managing to organize her closet. Hal and Mel eventually break up, as Joe finishes cleaning her closet, while Lennox gets caught with her bad boy.
5	5	"The Perfect Storm"	Steve Zuckerman	Larry Reitzer	September 7, 2010	1008	1.64
Mel's father Russell Burke (Christopher Rich) comes over and undermines Mel's authority concerning Lennox's studying and he bribes Joe with a Rolex.
6	6	"Spies & Lies"	David Trainer	Brenda Hsueh	September 14, 2010	1006	1.40
Joe's suspicious behavior prompts Mel to assume that he is in a relationship, when in reality he has teamed up with a former co-worker in hopes of finding Mel's brother-in-law, Lewis. Meanwhile, Mel and Lennox team up to conquer what they think is Ryder's bully, after they discover him missing his new shoes and backpack. It turns out that Ryder himself gave his possessions to a friend, in hopes of repaying him since his family was impacted by Ryder's own parents' dishonest investment.
7	7	"Up Close & Personal"	David Trainer	Miriam Trogdon	September 21, 2010	1007	1.32
Celeste Vega (Valery Ortiz), a TV reporter doing a story on Mel's life, is more intrigued with Joe's duties as a nanny and is out to make Mel look like an incompetent council woman.
8	8	"Dancing With the Stars of Toledo"	Ted Wass	Matt Boren	September 28, 2010	1005	0.96
Mel agrees to appear at a Dancing with the Stars type charity event with Joe helping her to get ready for it. Mark Ballas and Finola Hughes guest star.
9	9	"Seoul Man"	Tim O'Donnell	David Kendall & Bob Young	October 5, 2010	1009	0.90
A crackdown on illegal domestic workers working for city council members begins and Mel pleads with Joe to get his birth certificate so he can continue working for her. But what Joe hasn't told Mel is that he wasn't actually born in America, he was born in an American army hospital in Korea and that finding his legal papers is a daunting task because of him moving around as a kid. Meanwhile, Lennox and her best friend Phoebe agree to go to the school dance together as friends but rumors soon escalate that they are going as a lesbian couple.
10	10	"In Lennox We Trust"	Steve Zuckerman	Jennifer Glickman	October 12, 2010	1011	1.28
Mel is pleased when she learns Lennox is dating the mayor's son. However, she learns that the boy's good nature is just a façade. Guest stars include Ted McGinley as the mayor and Katherine Helmond (who co-starred for eight years in the structurally similar series, Who's the Boss?) as the family's deceptively senile neighbor.
11	11	"A Fright in the Attic"	David Tranier	Seth Kurland	October 19, 2010	1010	1.52
On Halloween, Joe hears noises in the attic and goes up there to check. There he finds Mel's brother-in-law, Lewis (John Ross Bowie), who is still hiding from the law. Lennox and Ryder have been bringing him food and want to spend some time with him before he turns himself in. They end up fooling Mel and Joe, who follow Lewis and the children to a Halloween party. In the end, Lewis is taken away by a person they believe is a police officer. However, he was actually hired by Lewis, who escapes the law once again. Julia Duffy guest stars as Mirna Sherwood, Mel and Joe's neighbor. Allusion to Sabrina, the Teenage Witch: Upon spotting a teenage witch at the party, Mel says to Joe, "Been there. Done that", referring to the titular character she played from 1996 to 2003.
12	12	"Joe Knows"	Steve Zuckerman	Jennifer Glickman	October 26, 2010	1015	1.38
Joe and Mel create web episodes, titled "Joe Knows", to promote his financial advice. He quickly gains popularity, not by his initial premise, but rather Mel's branding. Lennox starts to develop a crush on her chemistry tutor, who turns her down.
Part 2
13	13	"Enemies with Benefits"	Steve Zuckerman	Jordana Arkin	June 29, 2011	1012	1.54
Joe's ex-wife Tiffany (Megan Hilty) seeks a renewal of their relationship when she has a pregnancy scare; Lennox struggles with popularity issues.
14	14	"Don't Train on My Parade"	Steve Zuckerman	Matt Boren	July 6, 2011	1019	1.08
When Joe starts dating Mel's personal trainer (Jessalyn Wanlim), the two find it difficult to balance Joe's new romance and Mel's workout needs. Meanwhile, Lennox tries to maintain a friendship with Beckett, despite her feelings toward him.
15	15	"Lost in Translation"	Steve Zuckerman	Seth Kurland	July 13, 2011	1021	1.03
Mel enlists Joe's translating services when a Japanese client comes to town, only to regret her decision after Joe interferes with a possibility of romance. Meanwhile, Ryder plays the role of mediator for Lennox and her ex-best friend, who must work on a project together. Guest star: Elizabeth Sarah McLaughlin
16	16	"Joe Versus the Reunion"	Jeff Melman	Larry Reitzer	July 20, 2011	1020	0.98
Mel, sympathizing for Joe's unfortunate year, pretends to be Joe's girlfriend at his college reunion. Meanwhile, Lennox and Ryder, left home alone, dream of throwing a wild party, only for it to be quite mild. Allusion to My Fake Fiancé: Joe accuses Mel of barging into his reunion and pretending to be his "fake fiancée", a nod to the 2009 ABC Family movie in which Melissa Joan Hart and Joey Lawrence both starred in.
17	17	"Toledo's Next Top Model"	David Trainer	Jordana Arkin	July 27, 2011	1017	0.88
An encounter with a scout (Vivica A. Fox) leaves Lennox wanting to become a model, but her decision isn't final until she obtains Mel's permission. Meanwhile, Joe helps Ryder ask a girl named Holly (Rachel G. Fox) out, but she ends up controlling his life.
18	18	"The Mel Word"	Steve Zuckerman	Sarah Jane Cunningham & Suzie V. Freeman	August 3, 2011	1028	1.02
Mel plans her cousin's lesbian wedding, and is put in an awkward position when her soon to be cousin-in-law hits on both her and Joe. Lennox and Ryder attempt to create a documentary exposing the prejudice of the nuptials. Guest starring: Leslie Grossman, Courtney Henggeler
19	19	"Auction Hero"	David Trainer	Jennifer Glickman	August 3, 2011	1018	1.05
Mel auctions off Joe Longo in an auction for his cleaning services, but wonders about ulterior motives of the highest bidder. Lennox Scanlon has ten days to write a novel to prove her writing ability to her teacher.
20	20	"Waiting for Mr. Right"	David Trainer	Matt Boren	August 10, 2011	1014	1.04
Mel's last single friend gets engaged, so she feels pressured to find a husband, which leads to her continuing in a dull relationship, which Joe advises against.
21	21	"Young Love"	Ted Wass	Jennifer Glickman	August 17, 2011	1023	0.98
Mel starts dating a much younger man, George, and lies about her age while Lennox deal with competition for the post of editor of the school's blog. Roman becomes the Lennox's love interest.
22	22	"Mel & Joe's Anniversary"	Ted Wass	Seth Kurland	August 17, 2011	1024	1.14
George has a party to introduce Mel to all of his friends. Meanwhile, Joe gets upset at his ex-wife, Tiffany, for disrespecting their anniversary.
23	23	"Going the Distance?"	Ted Wass	Jordana Arkin	August 24, 2011	1025	1.02
Mel reexamines her romance with George. Elsewhere, Holly introduces her parents (Sean O'Bryan and Wendy Makkena) to Ryder.
24	24	"All Politics is Local"	Shelley Jensen	David Kendall & Bob Young	August 24, 2011	1016	1.07
Mel's father comes back to town to support a bill Mel opposes. Meanwhile, Lennox's poetry proves popular with a classmate who is an aspiring singer.
25	25	"The Other Longo"	David Trainer	Seth Kurland	August 31, 2011	1013	0.89
Joe's younger brother (Matthew Lawrence) arrives in town and is attracted to Mel. Meanwhile, Lennox dodges a sick Ryder in order to ensure that she is able to attend a highly anticipated party.
26	26	"Teacher/Teacher"	Jeff Melman	Larry Reitzer	August 31, 2011	1029	0.96
Ryder lands in hot water with his teacher (Andrew Lawrence) because of Joe. Elsewhere, Mel gets Lennox into an over-18 concert.
27	27	"Play Ball"	Leonard R. Garner, Jr.	Ed Driscoll	September 7, 2011	1026	0.94
Mel recruits Joe to play on her office softball team, as she is determined to beat her rival's team (Tom Wilson). Meanwhile, Ryder wants Lennox to feature Holly's short story in the school blog.
28	28	"A House Divided"	Ted Wass	Sarah Jane Cunningham & Suzie V. Freeman	September 7, 2011	1022	0.83
Mel and Joe get into a property dispute with their neighbor (John Ratzenberger); Ryder films a public service announcement starring Lennox and a school jock (Blake Jenner).
29	29	"Do As I Say, Not As I Did"	David Trainer	Julie Brown	September 14, 2011	1027	1.27
Fearing that she will give into peer pressure, Mel and Joe follow Lennox to her all night after-party. Meanwhile, while studying with another girl, Ryder seizes the opportunity to stand up to Holly.
30	30	"The Settlement"	Jeff Melman	David Kendall & Bob Young	September 14, 2011	1030	1.39
Joe considers new found possibilities, when he comes into a large sum of money. Meanwhile, a water leak is found on the living room ceiling. When Joe comes into nearly $167,000, he decides to resign from being a nanny and moves. Mel starts interviewing for a new nanny but can't find one she likes. Mel visits Joe in his new apartment, and as she leaves she kisses him, much to the surprise of both of them. When Joe goes to collect his money, he doesn't receive it because his address being the same as Lennox and Ryder is seen as suspicious. When he explains this to Mel, she agrees that he should move back in and continue to be their nanny. Allusion to Blossom: In a moment of shock, Joe utters "Whoa!" and notes "I haven't said that in a long time", referencing his famous catchphrase from the 1990s series in which he co-starred alongside Mayim Bialik.

=== Season 2 (2012) ===
No. overall	No. in season	Title	Directed by	Written by	Original release date	Prod. code	US viewers (millions)
31	1	"I Can Manage"	Jeff Melman	David Kendall & Bob Young	May 30, 2012	2001	1.21
In the second-season opener, Mel has her home renovated, but the construction work does not go smoothly. Meanwhile, Lennox's school puts on a play she wrote, but the audience reaction is not what she anticipated.
32	2	"If You Can't Stand the Heat"	Jeff Melman	Seth Kurland	May 30, 2012	2002	1.25
Mel and Joe attempt to respect each other's privacy after they have a quarrel about boundaries. Elsewhere, Lennox dreads working on the spirit committee at school, but her attitude changes after she meets the president of the club, Aidan (Cody Linley).
33	3	"Good to Go"	Rob Schiller	Jennifer Glickman	June 6, 2012	2003	1.07
When Mel and Joe walk in on Lennox and Aidan in bed together, they try to steer her away from sex, while Aidan's parents (Beth Littleford and David Starzyk) are delighted at the idea of the two being each other's "first". Holly tries to get Ryder to shave for the first time.
34	4	"All Up in My Business"	Melissa Joan Hart	Sarah Jane Cunningham & Suzie V. Freeman	June 6, 2012	2007	1.08
Joe thinks that Mel is having an affair with a married man after he overhears a phone conversation and seeks to expose her. Lennox's friend has a boyfriend, Haskell (Gregg Sulkin), that has been crushing on her and she tries to find the right words to tell Scarlett. Meanwhile, Ryder looks for a perfect birthday present for Holly.
35	5	"The Knockout"	Steve Zuckerman	Bob Young & David Kendall	June 13, 2012	2005	1.11
Mel punches a man after he insults Ryder at a movie theater and the encounter goes viral. She then plans on using her newfound fame in her campaign for an upcoming election. Lennox tries to befriend the new girl in school, but the girl only ends up taking advantage of her, as predicted by Joe.
36	6	"Breaking Up is Hard to Do"	Jeff Melman	Sarah Jane Cunningham & Suzie V. Freeman	June 20, 2012	2014	1.49
Mel plans on breaking up with her insecure, out-of-work boyfriend, Donald (Tommy Dewey), but she feels bad, so she enlists Joe to give him employment tips, along with a makeover before she delivers the bad news. Mel is then smitten by his new look and regains interest, although Joe's tips have turned him into an egoistical jerk. Meanwhile, Holly confides to Lennox that she had accidentally kissed another boy at a party and tells her to not tell Ryder. Ryder, however, already knows the truth and plans on taking advantage of Holly's guilt for as long as he can. She then discovers this and is not amused Allusion to Dancing with the Stars: Mel teases Joe about his "famous" ravioli, asking him if they went on Dancing with the Stars, and he replies, "Finished higher than you did".
37	7	"Mixed Doubles"	David Trainer	Jennifer Glickman	June 27, 2012	2009	1.42
After a conversation about each other constantly seeing the wrong people, Mel and Joe agree to date someone that the other person set up for them. Joe goes on a date with Ariel (Dilshad Vadsaria), one of Mel's business colleagues, and it seemingly goes well until she refuses to partake in Joe's interests. Mel sees Clark (John Ducey), a friend of Joe's, who gets overly emotional when reminiscing about his ex-wife. Lennox is kicked off of the school blog and so she decides to create her own, devoting all of her free time to it. This annoys her new boyfriend, Haskell, whom she begins to ignore. Allusion to Clarissa Explains It All: Ryder suggests that Lennox call her blog "Lennox Explains It All" when she has difficulty picking out a fitting name. Lennox refers to the idea as "original", though the name refers to the 1990s teen sitcom starring Melissa Joan Hart.
38	8	"The Donor"	David Kendall	David Valliere	July 11, 2012	2015	1.21
Mel's friend Jackie (Christine Lakin) decides to have a baby with the help of a sperm donor and asks Mel to help her decide between two anonymous men. Mel quickly finds out that Jackie's top choice is none other than Joe, with him telling her that he had donated out of desperation for money right out of the Ponzi scheme. Mel then tries to get Jackie to pick someone else, to no avail. When she hears that Joe's donation has suddenly become unavailable, Jackie takes matters into her own hands, deciding to get Joe to do it "the old-fashioned way". Lennox and Haskell have problems, when Haskell wants to sell an old book that they found at a garage sale for a large sum of money, while Lennox sees the book as a symbol of their love.
39	9	"Eat, Pray, Date"	Leonard R. Garner, Jr.	Larry Reitzer	July 18, 2012	2004	1.01
Mel is dating a new guy named Travis (Travis Schuldt), who is under the impression that she is a fantastic cook after he tastes some of Joe's creations. Travis then insists on having a cooking date with Mel, which results in her asking Joe for help. He teaches her to create a chicken dish, but trouble arises when Travis brings over uncooked lobster instead. Lennox finds out that one of her popular friends, Noelle (Hayley Erin), is in love with Ryder. Holly is out of town and Ryder considers leaving her for Noelle, so Lennox feels inclined to fix the mess in order to save her reputation.
40	10	"Pretty Big Liars"	Steve Zuckerman	Seth Kurland	July 25, 2012	2006	1.25
Ryder and Lennox inherit $1,000 each and Ryder wants to invest all of it into a new company that sells high-tech jumping shoes. Joe warns him against it with his experience in the stock market, but Ryder tells him to help invest it anyway. However, the stocks rise at a fast pace and Ryder thinks that he is rich, but in reality, Joe never invested any of the money because he was wary of the company. Meanwhile, Lennox and Haskell have broken up after she caught him making out with another girl. Mel meets Haskell's father, Sam (Shawn Christian), and the two start a secret affair in order to not upset Lennox. Title reference: Pretty Little Liars, which also airs on ABC Family.
41	11	"A Pair of Sneakers"	Linda Mendoza	Kara Lee Burk	August 1, 2012	2012	1.23
Mel and Lennox are arguing over their driving lesson arrangements. They both think that the other person is the worse driver. Joe offers to give Lennox driving lessons instead, but Mel wants to be the one to teach her niece. He then goes behind her back and takes Lennox for a drive. She ends up hitting a mailbox and denting Mel's car, with Joe taking the blame for her. Meanwhile, Joe had stumbled into Ryder having a photo session with Mel's shoes and sticking his arm into her pantyhose, resulting in weird looks. It turned out that Mel had agreed to give Ryder community service hours in exchange for him going through her wardrobe for flawed clothing and they decided to keep it from Joe.
42	12	"Mother of All Problems"	Jeff Melman	Larry Reitzer	August 8, 2012	2013	1.09
Mel's mother, Monica (Rita Rudner), has come to visit and it is clear that she does not have a great relationship with Mel or her grandchildren, as she always criticizes everyone. Joe has a talk with her and accidentally convinces her to divorce Mel's father, who has been cheating on her with a much younger woman. Not wanting to participate in gym class, Lennox goes along with her teacher's (Julie Brown) assumption that she is pregnant, which gets out of hand.
43	13	"Wherefore Art Thou Lennox"	Joey Lawrence	Sarah Jane Cunningham & Suzie V. Freeman	August 15, 2012	2008	1.28
Mel is in a heated debate with Councillor Mueller (Jackie Hoffman). Lennox is her aunt's new intern, and she starts to hang out with Cameron (Jacob Artist), Mueller's intern. Mel disapproves, seeing it as hanging with the enemy due to their political differences. Lennox insists that is not what it is about and gets angry. Meanwhile, Joe hasn't been getting much sleep due to his new job as an online consultant to businessmen in Russia. He is also seeing a Russian woman, Elena (Anya Monzikova), who shows up in Toledo unexpectedly.
44	14	"From Russia With Love"	Rob Schiller	Jennifer Glickman	August 22, 2012	2010	1.22
While things are heating up between Joe and Elena, Mel dislikes this sudden intrusion in her household, with Elena getting in the way of Joe's responsibilities. When Elena becomes angry at Joe, Joe depends on Mel to get through to her. In the process, Mel reveals some feelings for Joe that she never realized she had. Ryder volunteers to be Lennox's guinea pig for a study on what their school's vending machine junk food does to students. Later, Elena's business firm in Russia has been caught in a financial scandal similar to Joe's and she learns that she would be arrested as soon as she returns home. To save Elena, Joe asks her to marry him in order to become a U.S. citizen. Part one of two.
45	15	"Mel Marries Joe"	Rob Schiller	Stefanie Leder	August 29, 2012	2011	1.50
Wedding plans are coming into place for Joe and Elena while Mel is still skeptical of their "green card marriage". When an immigration officer shows up at the house under suspicions of a scam, Mel tells him that she, as a councilwoman, is willing to perform the ceremony in order to make it look legitimate. She lends Elena an old wedding dress and it turns out that Mel had been engaged once before. On the big day, Mel is reluctant to go through with the ceremony, possibly due to a mix of her skepticism and her feelings for Joe. In the end, Joe marries Elena with the feeling that it is true love after all, but later, Elena receives a call that prompts her to fly back to Russia in order to testify for one of her innocent colleagues. Mel and Joe are left in the suite and the two toast to the next "Mrs. Longo", wherever she may be. Part two of two.

=== Season 3 (2013–14) ===
No. overall	No. in season	Title	Directed by	Written by	Original release date	Prod. code	US viewers (millions)
46	1	"Works for Me"	Jeff Melman	David Kendall & Bob Young	May 29, 2013	3001	0.97
Distraught over the possibility of never re-entering the financial world, Joe seeks other venues with the neighbors, while Mel desperately attempts to demonstrate his importance to the family. Meanwhile, Lennox becomes obsessed with discovering the identity of a girl her artist boyfriend, Zander (Sterling Knight), has been drawing in his notebook. Elsewhere, Ryder goes on a camping trip and has a run-in with the law after he is the only one (of all of his friends) to admit that they smoked pot.
47	2	"Toxic Parents"	Rob Schiller	Sarah Jane Cunningham & Suzie V. Freeman	June 5, 2013	3002	0.81
When Mel and Joe discover that they are dating a divorced man and woman who were formerly married, they attempt to win over the affections of the ex-couple's child, with disastrous results as the child becomes trapped in a storm drain. The Parents then proceed to dump them both. Meanwhile, Lennox wants to rebel against her boyfriend Zander's sexist stereotype and considers getting a tattoo. Elsewhere, Ryder mopes around the house, missing his former high school life.
48	3	"Inside Job"	Rob Schiller	Bob Young & David Kendall	June 12, 2013	3003	1.02
Mel gets Joe a government job, but problems arise when Joe is caught in another financial scandal, putting Mel's career on the line. It turns out their boss was behind the scandals and he is caught on a wire and is later arrested as the news presenter then announces. As Joe was allegedly involved in the scandal he loses his job. Elsewhere, Lennox must kiss an attractive classmate when she stars in the school play. Note: Alimi Ballard makes a cameo in this episode. He played 'The Quizmaster' in Melissa Joan Hart's long running hit show, Sabrina the Teenage Witch.
49	4	"Can't Hardly Wait"	Melissa Joan Hart	Christopher Luccy	June 12, 2013	3007	0.76
Joe dates his chiropractor, Dr. Chelsea Mullins (Marla Sokoloff), following a back injury. After Mel tells him about a book suggesting new couples abstain from sex, he decides he doesn't want to rush their new romance. Chelsea reveals that she is still a virgin, waiting for that perfect man, and as their relationship continues, Joe finds waiting unbearable. Elsewhere, Ryder and Zander team up to work on a graphic novel, but the project hits a sour note when Lennox becomes their editor.
50	5	"Oh Brother"	Jeff Melman	Seth Kurland	June 19, 2013	3004	1.05
Mel begins dating an old pal from childhood (Trevor Donovan), and Joe worries that Mel and her beau may be related and not know it. He and Mel plot to discover the truth. Elsewhere, Lennox learns that one of her blog sponsors engages in unfair labor practices, and struggles with the guilt of involving herself with the company while loving her new phone.
51	6	"The Truth Hurts"	Jeff Melman	Seth Kurland	June 26, 2013	3005	0.98
Mel and Austin's romantic weekend adventure gets ruined thanks to Joe, and they are not allowed to have sex. Meanwhile, Ryder gets a classmate when Joe introduces him to a fellow home schooled student, but Ryder is annoyed by how much of a nerd he is.
52	7	"The Unkindest Cut"	Robbie Countryman	Jennifer Glickman	July 10, 2013	3006	0.82
Mel starts to imagine having a family with Austin. However she learns Austin decided he never wanted children at 25 and had a vasectomy. This puts a strain on their relationship. Austin points out that Lennox and Ryder are basically her children, and Joe babysits the neighbor's baby, Tucker, bringing him over to the house so he can remind Mel of her dreams of wanting her own child. Meanwhile, Lennox is faced with the challenge of writing her college admissions essay, and she hires Ryder to boss her around until she finishes. Note: The baby playing Tucker is actually Melissa Joan Hart's son, Tucker Wilkerson, in real life.
53	8	"The Unfriending"	Rob Schiller	Sarah Jane Cunningham & Suzie V. Freeman	July 17, 2013	3008	0.91
Joe encourages Mel to ditch her clingy friend, Anita, but when Mel thinks that Anita's finally out of her life for good, she and Joe begin dating. Mel is convinced Anita just wants to be back in her life, while Joe believes it is a genuine relationship, so they plot to uncover the truth. Meanwhile, Lennox tries to figure out why Zander won't share his SAT scores. Upon discovering he scored higher than her, Lennox gets angry and realizes just how competitive she is.
54	9	"Something Happened"	Rob Schiller	Jennifer Glickman	July 24, 2013	3009	0.96
Mel and Joe discover through Lennox's blog that she recently lost her virginity to Zander. Mel is bothered that Lennox downplays sex and didn't feel she could share with her aunt, so she decides to help her niece have a more rewarding sex.life. Joe is completely against this idea, trying to deny the event. After Zander breaks up with Lennox soon after, Joe gets angry and goes to have a talk with him. Elsewhere, Ryder plays up his undeserved rebel reputation to impress his girlfriend, but this approach backfires with her parents, who insist that they stop seeing one another.
55	10	"Family Feud" "Good Morning Toledo"	Adam Weissman	Julie Whitesell	July 31, 2013	3014	1.00
Mel and Joe cohost a local morning show and win over viewers, but their candor about Lennox's and Ryder's lives upsets the teens. Allusion to The Kings of Summer: Ryder exclaims that one day he could run away and build a house in the woods, a reference to the plot of The Kings of Summer, which he stars in.
56	11	"Fast Times"	Jeff Melman	Jennifer Glickman	August 7, 2013	3011	0.91
After Mel's new boyfriend Noah's apartment floods, Mel tries to get their relationship progressing quickly by inviting him to live with her for the week. Elsewhere, Lennox encounters difficulty waking up in the morning for her new internship.
57	12	"Bad Influence"	Joey Lawrence	Stefanie Leder	August 14, 2013	3012	0.74
Joe and Ryder mistakenly sell an old video of Mel's at a garage sale, and Mel is desperate to get it back. Elsewhere, Lennox's pen pal looks forward to meeting her now that he is out of prison.
58	13	"Teach Your Children"	Jeff Melman	Stefanie Leder	August 21, 2013	3010	0.85
Joe works out an alternative payment plan when he begins dating the mother of one of his students, which unintentionally earns him a reputation among the other mothers in the neighborhood as a tutor-prostitute. Meanwhile, Zander and Lennox decide to skip college and drive around the country in a motor home—which doesn't sit well with "cool" aunt Mel. And Ryder introduces his vegan girlfriend to the joys of meat.
59	14	"What Happens in Jersey... (Part 1)"	David Kendall	David Kendall & Bob Young	August 28, 2013	3015	0.91
Joe is returning home to Jersey for the 99th birthday of his grandmother (Doris Roberts) but reveals that she doesn't know that he is divorced and that telling her might kill her. Joe, Ryder and Lennox convince Mel to pose as Joe's wife to keep his grandmother happy. Things get complicated, however, when the birthday girl treats Mel and Joe to a special "love potion". Meanwhile, Lennox may be falling for Joe's nephew (Kevin Fontayne) and Ryder fears he has been drafted into the Mafia.
60	15	"What Happens in Jersey... (Part 2)"	Phill Lewis	David Kendall & Bob Young	September 4, 2013	3016	1.13
After a night of heavy drinking, Joe and Mel end up sleeping together to their own shock. Ryder gets worked up about helping out Joe's mother with "the rat". Lennox finds out that Marco was only pretending to be into her to make his ex-girlfriend jealous. Mel, as Tiffany, mistakenly makes a deathbed promise to Nona that she and Joe will stay together forever. Joe tells Mel that they should take a shot at a relationship, though Mel insists that it would never work out due to their constant bickering and takes a plane back to Toledo alone. When Mel gets back, Austin arrives, telling her that he wants her back and wants a family with her someday. Joe returns shortly after and realizes that he might have missed his opportunity.
61	16	"A New Kind of Christmas"	Rob Schiller	Seth Kurland	December 11, 2013	3013	1.22
Mel's sister, Meredith (Jaime Pressly), comes home from prison on furlough to celebrate Christmas with the kids and Mel, and seems unruffled by Joe's obvious animosity towards her. Note: this episode is a Christmas special and was only put in after EP15 because it was near Christmas. Episode 15 ends on a cliff hanger and is continued in episode 17. Note: Christmas special as part of ABC Family's 25 Days of Christmas.
62	17	"A Decent Proposal"	David Kendall	David Kendall & Bob Young	January 15, 2014	3017	1.25
Joe rushes home to tell Mel that he has feelings for her after their romantic night together in New Jersey. When he arrives, he is shocked to find Austin (Trevor Donovan) has shown up and wants to give his relationship with Mel another try. Deciding he can't stay and watch them fall in love all over again, Joe quits. Meanwhile, Lennox plots to get Joe and Mel together and Ryder gets appendicitis and ends up in hospital.
63	18	"Independence Day"	Rob Schiller	Jennifer Glickman	January 22, 2014	3018	1.21
Mel decides that she wants to take it slow with Joe, but it backfires when he decides to move out so that he can properly "court" her. Joe finds an apartment, but ends up taking a ridiculous amount of shifts at his new job to afford it after declining Mel's help. When Mel accidentally gets Joe fired, she sees it as a good thing until Joe is hired as a new live-in nanny for one of the neighbors. Meanwhile, Lennox finds it hard to collaborate with Zander on a creative project amidst their relationship pause.
64	19	"The New Deal"	Rob Schiller	Stefanie Leder	January 29, 2014	3019	1.36
Joe is really busy with his new job and is finding it trouble to spend time with Mel. She tries to sneak over to his place even though his employer's has a strict "no guest policy". Joe later quits because he "works for a disgusting woman." Ryder is worried about getting the right look for starting school and accidentally starts a video called, "I peed my pants."
65	20	"Feel the Burn"	Robbie Countryman	Seth Kurland	February 5, 2014	3020	1.13
Mel decides to burn off some calories seeing that she won a 10 course dining experience for her and Joe in an auction. When her trainer becomes unavailable, she asks Joe to teach the exercise class she goes to. They have a disagreement and he kicks her out of the class. They later go to a dinner, still fighting. Lennox and Zander get ready to send their website series, "Cassandra" to be judged, however they have a big fight in between.
66	21	"Plus One"	Melissa Joan Hart	Christopher Luccy	February 12, 2014	3021	1.06
Mel takes Joe to a work dinner, where he shares his and her opinions, getting bad press for Mel.
67	22	"House Broken"	Jeff Melman	David Valliere	February 26, 2014	3022	0.89
Mel gets a dog against Joe's wishes. After a day of hanging out, the dog (Wendell) forms an attachment for Joe and Mel gets jealous when Wendell sneaks into Joe's room and sleeps with him overnight. Joe tries to show Mel how much Wendell loves her by hiding dog treats under the pillows on the couch. While talking to Lennox, Mel realises that she wants a baby. Mel tries to tell Joe that she wants a baby but has trouble and says she wants Wendell micro-chipped. Lennox finds out that Wendell has an owner (Paxton) because one of the 9,000 followers on Instagram had proof but that he ran away. Joe admits to Mel that he was so against the idea of getting a dog because it was so similar to raising a baby and that he was intimidated. Ryder starts seeing Stella, a teen mom, who is highly motivated, responsible, and wants to get into a good college. Stella tells Ryder that now isn't a good time for her to have sex, especially since she made some poor decisions last year, he seems bummed, but respects her decision and they sit in Joe's car looking up at the stars.
68	23	"Couples Therapy"	Joey Lawrence	Julie Whitesell	March 5, 2014	3023	0.99
Joe and Mel decide to join couples therapy. The counselor, Dr. Kathryn Miller, turns out to be Joe's ex girlfriend. Lennox has complications dating her teacher's assistant when Zander shows up at her doorstep. Guest star: Elizabeth Berkley Lauren as Dr. Kathryn Miller
69	24	"To Tell The Truth"	Jeff Melman	Jennifer Glickman	March 12, 2014	3024	0.86
Mel and Joe start double dating with another couple that they really like. However, Nate tells Joe a secret who tells Mel and then who tells Gillian. They later go to dinner and the couple leave Mel & Joe a note. Guest star: Tamera Mowry as Gillian
70	25	"My Roof, My Rules"	Jeff Melman	Julie Whitesell	March 19, 2014	3025	0.98
Lennox's romance with Emerson is exposed, so Mel follows Joe's advice and forbids the relationship, leading Lennox to move out. Elsewhere, Ryder forgets his passport and gets stuck at the Canada–US border. Guest star: Jack DeSena
71	26	"Chaperones"	Rob Schiller	David Kendall & Bob Young	March 26, 2014	3026	1.01
Mel and Joe chaperone a dance at Ryder's school, but they "misbehave" and get thrown out. Meanwhile, Ryder plans to end his relationship with Stella, but he changes his mind after he helps her take care of an ill Isabel.
72	27	"I'll Cut You"	Rob Schiller	Michael Curtis & Roger S.H. Schulman	April 2, 2014	3027	0.91
When Joe is in his car, he gets hit by another person. Mel struggles to choose sides when she finds out that Calista, her hairdresser, hit him. In the end, Lennox has to be the one to sort it all out. Ryder desperately tries to win Stella back but has difficulty in finding something romantic enough to do, he seeks help from Lennox.
73	28	"Catch & Release"	Melissa Joan Hart	Stefanie Leder	April 9, 2014	3028	0.95
Mel wonders if she can trust Joe when his old buddy Charlie enlists him as a wingman. Lennox becomes jealous when she meets Zander's new roommates (Erin Sanders and Meaghan Martin) Guest stars: David Lascher and Elisa Donovan (both of whom acted in both Blossom and Sabrina the Teenage Witch)
74	29	"Born To Run"	Joey Lawrence	Seth Kurland	April 16, 2014	3029	0.99
Mel's father is back and causes trouble when an embarrassing text of his goes public, threatening her bid for an upcoming election.
75	30	"More Than Roommates"	Stuart Bass	Holly Hester	April 23, 2014	3030	0.87
Joe inherits his grandmother's old chair and wants it placed in the living room. Mel has trouble telling Joe that she doesn't think it fits. Nona then appears to her in a dream and gets her to sit in the chair. When Joe sees the wine stain that Mel created, the two argue, but end up finding out that Nona had hid $10,000 in the chair for Joe. Meanwhile, Ryder offers moving help to Zander's roommates and ends up hooking up with one of them. Allusion (pun) to The Book of Mormon musical: Lennox jokes about Ryder recent continuous singing, comparing him to a lead in a bad musical: "you know... The Book of Moron".
76	31	"Accidents Will Happen"	Robbie Countryman	Christopher Luccy	April 30, 2014	3031	0.89
Mel thinks that she is pregnant after taking a home pregnancy test. When Joe finds the test, Lennox says it is hers to cover for Mel. Meanwhile, Ryder needs to pass a math test so he enlists the school nerd to tutor bot him and a popular girl in their class. Guest stars: Beth Broderick (who also played 'Aunt Zelda' in Sabrina the Teenage Witch), Sterling Knight, Zedrick Restauro, and Denyse Tontz.
77	32	"Right Time, Right Place"	Jeff Melman	Jennifer Glickman	May 7, 2014	3032	0.82
Mel has planned the perfect wedding for her friend, but when the wedding is abruptly cancelled, Mel suggests that she and Joe take the next step and get married instead. Joe turns her down the first time because he doesn't think that they're ready. Ryder later spots Joe at a jewellery store and everyone assumes that he is planning a proposal. This leads to Mel becoming increasingly frustrated throughout their date night when she keeps looking for the signs. However, Joe does end up proposing to Mel in front of the family and she says yes.
78	33	"Don't Look Back in Anger"	David Kendall	Christopher Luccy and Julie Whitesell	May 14, 2014	3037	0.89
Mel and Joe have a marriage ceremonial expert (Tim Conway) come to their house. They look back at all the things in the past.
79	34	"Uninvited"	Jeff Melman	Stefanie Leder	May 28, 2014	3033	1.02
Joe's mother visits unexpectedly, which irks Mel, but Joe saves his anger for another unplanned guest: his estranged brother. Elsewhere, Lennox and Ryder are not on the same page with her plans for his future.
80	35	"You're the One That I Want"	Rob Schiller	Seth Kurland	June 4, 2014	3034	0.97
Mel and Joe get ready to tie the knot. The guys go dirtbiking and Joe hurts his leg because of Ryder. Meanwhile Joey's nephew has the hots for Lennox which creates problems for her. Joey makes it to the altar, but during the vows he finds out he has a 13-year-old daughter he never knew about.
81	36	"Maybe I'm Amazed"	Rob Schiller	David Kendall & Bob Young	June 11, 2014	3035	0.96
Mel & Joe never finish the vows after Joe hears about his daughter Dani. They go to her hometown and meet her, then Dani (Jada Facer) comes to Toledo in a cab to see her father get married. Meanwhile, Lennox and Zander break up again, and Ryder announces to his aunt that he doesn't plan to go to college. Guest stars: Brooke Burke-Charvet as Felicia Mancini
82	37	"At Last"	David Kendall	Jennifer Glickman	June 18, 2014	3036	1.29
Problems arise when Joey tells Dani that she can move in without consulting Mel first. Lennox pursues Marco as a rebound after breaking it off with Zander. After the wedding minister quits, Ryder gets ordained online so he can perform the ceremony himself. When the wedding is finally set to occur, Mel falls off the roof and lands in the hospital. Not wanting to prolong their vows any longer, Mel and Joe are married in front of their loved ones in her hospital room.

=== Season 4 (2014–15) ===
No. overall	No. in season	Title	Directed by	Written by	Original release date	Prod. code	US viewers (millions)
Part 1
83	1	"Witch Came First"	Melissa Joan Hart	Jennifer Glickman	October 22, 2014	4001	1.19
Mel's doctor drops by on Halloween to convince Mel she was once a teenage witch and needs to battle the evil Dark Lord. At first Mel and Joe don't believe her, but then Joe's Halloween robot comes to life, and Mel accidentally turns Lennox into a cat. Joe begins to show a darker side of himself and Mel tries to trigger his memory to get the ghoul out of his body. Guest stars: Beth Broderick as Mel's doctor. Note: Halloween special as part of ABC Family's 13 Nights of Halloween. This episode is also a nod to Hart's previous series, Sabrina the Teenage Witch.
84	2	"A Melanie & Josiah Christmas"	Rob Schiller	Julie Whitesell	December 10, 2014	4006	1.00
Mel and Joe are about to celebrate their first Christmas as a married couple, which leads to a competition over whose family ornament should take the top spot on the tree. Both Mel and Joe have a flashback set in southern North America in the 1800s. Note: Second Christmas special as part of ABC Family's 25 Days of Christmas.
85	3	"The Honeymooners"	Rob Schiller	David Kendall & Bob Young	January 14, 2015	4002	0.95
Mel is less than thrilled when her honeymoon to Tahiti gets cancelled due to her broken leg, so Joe surprises her with a cabin getaway. But things go awry, and their dream vacation quickly becomes a nightmare. Meanwhile, Lennox tries to hide her relationship with Marco (guest star Kevin Fonteyne) from everyone, not realizing Joe had wired the house with cameras before he and Mel left.
86	4	"The Day After"	Rob Schiller	Seth Kurland	January 21, 2015	4003	0.78
Dani wants to go on a date with a boy at school, but Joe tells her she is too young. So she tricks Mel into taking her anyway. Meanwhile, Lennox and Marco (guest star Kevin Fonteyne) run into Zander (guest star Sterling Knight).
87	5	"Let's Get It Started"	Rob Schiller	Ed Driscoll	January 28, 2015	4004	0.98
Joe is eager to start a family, but Mel insists that she is not ready. She changes her mind after spending some time with a friend's baby, but Joe starts to worry about how their sex life might change. Ryder tells the family that he plans on skipping college and relocating to Louisiana to join AmeriCorps with a girl he recently met. Also, Lennox feels guilty about Marco taking Zander's assistant job, so sets him up with a friend of hers.
88	6	"Failure to Communicate"	David Kendall	Michael Curtis & Roger S.H. Schulman	February 4, 2015	4005	0.74
Mel, Joe, Lennox and Dani are anxious to videochat to Ryder in Louisiana to wish him a happy 18th birthday, but errors in the tablets and laptops, cause Joe to try and fix it himself, while Mel tries to hide from him that she has hired a professional to fix it. Mel also has a hidden reason for wanting to see Ryder on his 18th, due to her troubled past.
89	7	"Thanks But No Thanks"	Rob Schiller	Jennifer Glickman	February 11, 2015	4007	0.61
Mel and Joe write thank you notes for wedding gifts from family members. Meanwhile, Lennox gloats on how amazing her relationship is with Marco, but she finds out that he is going to Japan for six months, without him telling her. Mel and Joe quickly get rid of a huge coffee maker they received from Aunt Bunny, but they desperately try to find a new one when she decides to come to visit.
90	8	"Face the Music"	Rob Schiller	Seth Kurland	February 18, 2015	4008	0.68
While going through a box of Joe's things, Mel finds a CD from when Joe was in a boy band. Mel tells Lennox and Dani, and they begin to laugh. Meanwhile, Zander comes over, knowing that Zander hasn't told his girlfriend about them working together, Lennox insists he go back there to tell her. Mel learns that Dani is a good pianist and singer, but Joe doesn't seem to feel that proud. Mel and Joe have a talk in the kitchen, and Mel wants to know where his negative attitude coming from, so he confesses. Elsewhere, Zander tells Lennox that he told his girlfriend the truth, but Lennox soon finds out he lied when Zander freaks out when she calls him on Face Time. Lennox then feels desolated and cancels the movie, whilst Joe listens to Dani play on the piano. Dani feels like her dad is telling her she can't make it in the music business, and she runs off upstairs.
91	9	"Being There"	Rob Schiller	Julie Whitesell	February 25, 2015	4009	0.82
Joe bets Mel and the rest of the family that they cannot go 48 hours without their cell phones and computers. Things get tense when Joe finds himself in need of using his phone for a motivational speaker job, and Lennox finds him. They agree to not tell the others that they are both using their phones. Meanwhile, Dani catches Mel using her phone and they both agree to hide that fact from Lennox and Joe.
92	10	"Parental Guidance"	Rob Schiller	Michael Curtis & Roger S.H. Schulman	March 4, 2015	4010	0.74
Lennox becomes infatuated with her new professor, Evita Freeman, causing Mel to become jealous of their relationship. Meanwhile, Dani breaks the rules and drank some wine with her girlfriends, then lies to Joe about it. An angry and hurt Joe discovers her lie and tries to figure out how to handle the situation.
93	11	"Gone Girl"	Rob Schiller	Michael Curtis & Roger S.H. Shulman	March 11, 2015	4011	0.74
Joe insists Dani call Felicia, her mother, to tell her about drinking, but things go awry when Felicia quits her tour to take Dani back. Meanwhile, after her rude behavior confronting Lennox's college professor, Mel is willing to apologize to Lennox and spend time with her. Elsewhere, Felicia gives Joe a second chance and allows him to keep Dani with him, but Dani chooses to go home with her mom. Later, Lennox stands up to her college professor after she says making an impact is more important than the effect it might have on people.
94	12	"You Say You Want an Ovulation"	Rob Schiller	Nicole Larson	March 18, 2015	4018	0.70
Ryder's girlfriend dumps him for another guy, so Ryder quits AmeriCorps and moves back home, Joe wants Ryder to apply for college, Mel is trying to get pregnant. Ryder announces he is going to join the Navy.
Part 2
95	13	"Call of Duty"	Rob Schiller	Michael Curtis & Roger S.H. Shulman	June 3, 2015	4019	0.59
After discovering that she's not pregnant, an upset Mel secretly begins buying and hiding baby items around the house behind Joe's back. Meanwhile, Ryder is subjected to some intense basic training exercises by Joe in order to convince him not to join the Navy.
96	14	"You Little Devil"	Joey Lawrence	David Kendall	June 10, 2015	4012	0.61
When an old, ex-boyfriend of Mel's visits, the history of her devil tattoo comes to light, turning Joe off in the process. Meanwhile, Lennox trains an inexperienced actress to appear in a film based on her character, "Cassandra."
97	15	"The Book Club"	Robbie Countryman	Seth Kurland	June 17, 2015	4013	0.73
After Joe utters a few derogatory words about a visiting author's erotic novel, the woman comes onto him demanding that he demean her more. Elsewhere, while shooting the film adaptation of "Cassandra," Lennox becomes jealous of Zander and McKenna's blossoming relationship.
98	16	"The Early Shift"	Robbie Countryman	Jeremy Roth	June 24, 2015	4014	0.64
Joe takes a new job with demanding shifts and struggles to keep up with his married life. In order to stay awake for a very important meeting for Mel, Joe gets hyped up on energy drinks, causing the rich banker to think that he is on drugs. Meanwhile, McKenna and Zander's relationship reaches a breaking point, when production of "Cassandra" is completed, and the star reverts to her old self.
99	17	"The Parent Trap"	Robbie Countryman	Jennifer Glickman	July 1, 2015	4015	0.71
Mel talks Joe into telling Gloria that it is time for her to write a will. However, when he chickens out, Mel invites her father to try and persuade her, with unexpected results. Meanwhile, Zander and Lennox add a "friends with benefits" clause to their already complicated relationship.
100	18	"Melissa & Joey's Frozen"	Joey Lawrence	Julie Whitesell	July 8, 2015	4017	0.74
Mel and Joe get trapped in ice during an avalanche, and they awake 100 years later.
101	19	"Put a Ring on It"	David Kendall	Julie Brown	July 15, 2015	4016	0.63
Joe's fake birthday gift for Mel turns out to be better than the real one when Mel secretly hates both gifts and has to pretend to like them to spare Joe's feelings.
102	20	"Game Night"	Melissa Joan Hart	David Valliere	July 22, 2015	4022	0.66
With Ryder home on leave, the family takes a look back at their time together. Meanwhile, game night puts a toll on Mel and Joe's and Lennox and Zander's respective relationships.
103	21	"Be The Bigger Person"	Rob Schiller	Seth Kurland	July 29, 2015	4020	0.84
After vowing to eat healthier, Mel's public image is marred by a Twitter photo of her eating a hamburger. Meanwhile, forced out of his apartment by his roommates for not paying the rent, Zander moves in with Lennox.
104	22	"Double Happiness"	Rob Schiller	Jennifer Glickman	August 5, 2015	4021	0.94
Mel receives some shocking news about her pregnancy, she is having twins. Lennox and Zander's perspective on life changes when they are involved in a car accident on the way home from a friend's wedding. Mel announces her run for Congress, Lennox and Zander announce they are getting married in a year's time, Ryder receives his orders from the Navy, and Joe's book gets published.

== Ratings ==
=== Season 1 ===
No.	Title	Original air date	Viewers (million)	Rating (Adults 18–49)	Source
Part 1
1	"Pilot"	August 17, 2010	2.15	1.0	
2	"Moving On"	August 17, 2010	2.18 ▲	0.9 ▼	
3	"Nanny Love"	August 24, 2010	1.92 ▼	0.9	
4	"Boy Toys 'R' Us"	August 31, 2010	1.60 ▼	0.7 ▼	
5	"The Perfect Storm"	September 7, 2010	1.64 ▲	0.7	
6	"Spies & Lies"	September 14, 2010	1.40 ▼	0.7	
7	"Up Close & Personal"	September 21, 2010	1.32 ▼	0.7	
8	"Dancing With the Stars of Toledo"	September 28, 2010	0.96 ▼	0.3 ▼	
9	"Seoul Man"	October 5, 2010	0.90 ▼	0.4 ▲	
10	"In Lennox We Trust"	October 12, 2010	1.28 ▲	0.5 ▲	
11	"A Fright in the Attic"	October 19, 2010	1.52 ▲	0.6 ▲	
12	"Joe Knows"	October 26, 2010	1.38 ▼	0.6	
Part 2
13	"Enemies with Benefits"	June 29, 2011	1.54 ▲	0.6	
14	"Don't Train on My Parade"	July 6, 2011	1.08 ▼	0.4 ▼	
15	"Lost in Translation"	July 13, 2011	1.03 ▼	0.4	
16	"Joe Versus the Reunion"	July 20, 2011	0.98 ▼	0.4	
17	"Toledo's Next Top Model"	July 27, 2011	0.88 ▼	0.4	
18	"The Mel Word"	August 3, 2011	1.02 ▲	0.4	
19	"Auction Hero"	August 3, 2011	1.05 ▲	0.4	
20	"Waiting for Mr. Right"	August 10, 2011	1.04 ▼	0.5 ▲	
21	"Young Love"	August 17, 2011	0.98 ▼	0.4 ▼	
22	"Mel & Joe's Anniversary"	August 17, 2011	1.14 ▲	0.5 ▲	
23	"Going the Distance?"	August 24, 2011	1.02 ▼	0.5	
24	"All Politics is Local"	August 24, 2011	1.07 ▲	0.5	
25	"The Other Longo"	August 31, 2011	0.89 ▼	0.4 ▼	
26	"Teacher/Teacher"	August 31, 2011	0.96 ▲	0.4	
27	"Play Ball"	September 8, 2011	0.94 ▼	0.4	
28	"A House Divided"	September 8, 2011	0.83 ▼	0.4	
29	"Do As I Say, Not As I Did"	September 14, 2011	1.27 ▲	0.7 ▲	
30	"The Settlement"	September 14, 2011	1.39 ▲	0.7	

=== Season 2 ===
No.	Title	Original air date	Viewers (million)	Rating (Adults 18–49)	Source
1	"I Can Manage"	May 30, 2012	1.21 ▼	0.7	
2	"If You Can't Stand the Heat"	May 30, 2012	1.25 ▲	0.7	
3	"Good to Go"	June 6, 2012	1.07 ▼	0.5 ▼	
4	"All Up in My Business"	June 6, 2012	1.08 ▲	0.5	
5	"The Knockout"	June 13, 2012	1.11 ▲	0.5	
6	"Breaking Up is Hard to Do"	June 20, 2012	1.49 ▲	0.7 ▲	
7	"Mixed Doubles"	June 27, 2012	1.42 ▼	0.7	
8	"The Donor"	July 11, 2012	1.21 ▼	0.6 ▼	
9	"Eat, Pray, Date"	July 18, 2012	1.01 ▼	0.3 ▼	
10	"Pretty Big Liars"	July 25, 2012	1.25 ▲	0.6 ▲	
11	"A Pair of Sneakers"	August 1, 2012	1.23 ▼	0.5 ▼	
12	"Mother of All Problems"	August 8, 2012	1.09 ▼	0.5	
13	"Wherefore Art Thou Lennox"	August 15, 2012	1.28 ▲	0.6 ▲	
14	"From Russia With Love"	August 22, 2012	1.22 ▼	0.5 ▼	
15	"Mel Marries Joe"	August 29, 2012	1.50 ▲	0.7 ▲	

=== Season 3 ===
No.	Title	Original air date	Viewers (million)	Rating (Adults 18–49)	Source
1	"Works for Me"	May 29, 2013	0.97 ▼	0.5 ▼	
2	"Toxic Parents"	June 5, 2013	0.82 ▼	0.3 ▼	
3	"Inside Job"	June 12, 2013	1.02 ▲	0.5 ▲	
4	"Can't Hardly Wait"	June 12, 2013	0.76 ▼	0.3 ▼	
5	"Oh Brother"	June 19, 2013	1.05 ▲	0.5 ▲	
6	"The Truth Hurts"	June 26, 2013	0.98 ▼	0.5	
7	"The Unkindest Cut"	July 10, 2013	0.81 ▼	0.4 ▼	
8	"The Unfriending"	July 17, 2013	0.91 ▲	0.5 ▲	
9	"Something Happened"	July 24, 2013	0.96 ▲	0.4 ▼	
10	"Family Feud" "Good Morning Toledo"	July 31, 2013	1.00 ▲	0.4	
11	"Fast Times"	August 7, 2013	0.91 ▼	0.5 ▲	
12	"Bad Influence"	August 14, 2013	0.74 ▼	0.4 ▼	
13	"Teach Your Children"	August 21, 2013	0.85 ▲	0.5 ▲	
14	"What Happens in Jersey... (Part 1)"	August 28, 2013	0.91 ▲	0.5	
15	"What Happens in Jersey... (Part 2)"	September 4, 2013	1.13 ▲	0.6 ▲	
16	"A New Kind of Christmas"	December 11, 2013	1.22 ▲	0.6	
17	"A Decent Proposal"	January 15, 2014	1.25 ▲	0.6	
18	"Independence Day"	January 22, 2014	1.21 ▼	0.5 ▼	
19	"The New Deal"	January 29, 2014	1.36 ▲	0.7 ▲	
20	"Feel the Burn"	February 5, 2014	1.13 ▼	0.6 ▼	
21	"Plus One"	February 12, 2014	1.07 ▼	0.5 ▼	
22	"House Broken"	February 26, 2014	0.90 ▼	0.5	
23	"Couples Therapy"	March 5, 2014	0.99 ▲	0.5	
24	"To Tell The Truth"	March 12, 2014	0.86 ▼	0.4 ▼	
25	"My Roof, My Rules"	March 19, 2014	0.98 ▲	0.4	
26	"Chaperones"	March 26, 2014	1.01 ▲	0.5 ▲	
27	"I'll Cut You"	April 2, 2014	0.91 ▼	0.4 ▼	
28	"Catch & Release"	April 9, 2014	0.95 ▲	0.4	
29	"Born To Run"	April 16, 2014	0.99 ▲	0.5 ▲	
30	"More Than Roommates"	April 23, 2014	0.87 ▼	0.4 ▼	
31	"Accidents Will Happen"	April 30, 2014	0.89 ▲	0.4	
32	"Right Time, Right Place"	May 7, 2014	0.82 ▼	0.3 ▼	
33	"Don't Look Back in Anger"	May 14, 2014	0.89 ▲	0.4 ▲	
34	"Uninvited"	May 28, 2014	1.02 ▲	0.5 ▲	
35	"You're the One That I Want"	June 4, 2014	0.97 ▼	0.5	
36	"Maybe I'm Amazed"	June 11, 2014	0.96 ▼	0.4 ▼	
37	"At Last"	June 18, 2014	1.29 ▲	0.6 ▲	

=== Season 4 ===
No.	Title	Original air date	Viewers (million)	Rating (Adults 18–49)	Source
Part 1
1	"Witch Came First"	October 22, 2014	1.19 ▼	0.6	
2	"A Melanie & Josiah Christmas"	December 10, 2014	1.00 ▼	0.5 ▼	
3	"The Honeymooners"	January 14, 2015	0.95 ▼	0.5	
4	"The Day After"	January 21, 2015	0.78 ▼	0.4 ▼	
5	"Let's Get It Started"	January 28, 2015	0.98 ▲	0.5 ▲	
6	"Failure to Communicate"	February 4, 2015	0.74 ▼	0.4 ▼	
7	"Thanks But No Thanks"	February 11, 2015	0.61 ▼	0.3 ▼	
8	"Face The Music"	February 18, 2015	0.68 ▲	0.4 ▲	
9	"Being There"	February 25, 2015	0.82 ▲	0.4	
10	"Parental Guidance"	March 4, 2015	0.74 ▼	0.4	
11	"Gone Girl"	March 11, 2015	0.74	0.4	
12	"You Say You Want an Ovulation"	March 18, 2015	0.70 ▼	0.3 ▼	
Part 2
13	"Call Of Duty"	June 3, 2015	0.59 ▼	0.26 ▼	
14	"You Little Devil"	June 10, 2015	0.61 ▲	0.30 ▲	
15	"The Book Club"	June 17, 2015	0.73 ▲	0.37 ▲	
16	"The Early Shift"	June 24, 2015	0.65 ▼	0.32 ▼	
17	"The Parent Trap"	July 1, 2015	0.71 ▲	0.33 ▲	
18	"Melissa & Joey's Frozen"	July 8, 2015	0.74 ▲	0.30 ▼	
19	"Put A Ring On It"	July 15, 2015	0.63 ▼	0.30	
20	"Game Night"	July 22, 2015	0.66 ▲	0.27 ▼	
21	"Be The Bigger Person"	July 29, 2015	0.84 ▲	0.37 ▲	
22	"Double Happiness"	August 5, 2015	0.94 ▲	0.41 ▲	
