= Espionage Made Easy =

Studio album by Cold War
- Released: May 8, 2007
- Recorded: Victoria Street Studios, Costa Mesa, California, US
- Genre: Metalcore, hardcore punk
- Length: 33:36
- Label: Indecision
- Producer: Cold War; Justin Sturm

Cold War chronology
From Russia with Love (2004)	Espionage Made Easy (2007)

Espionage Made Easy is the second full-length studio album from Californian hardcore/metalcore band, Cold War. It was released in May 2007 on the notable independent hardcore specialist label, Indecision Records.

== Track listing ==
- All songs written by Cold War
1. "Bloodrush" – 2:22
2. "My Saviour" – 4:06
3. "The Mountain" – 4:10
4. "Gotta Be" – 2:28
5. "Fire It Up" – 3:25
6. "Intermission" – 0:18
7. "What Great Purpose" – 3:31
8. "Outside of the Incrowd" – 2:51
9. "Still Kickin" – 2:49
10. "The Traveler" – 4:49
11. "To the MaXXX" – 2:47

== Credits ==
- Steve Helferich – vocals
- Geoff Harman – guitar
- Justin Jolley – guitar
- Chris Thomson – bass
- Marc Jackson – drums
- Additional vocals by Dave Peters (Throwdown) and Dave Richards
- Additional guitars and bass by Justin Sturm
- Recorded and mixed at Victoria Street Studios, Costa Mesa, California, US
