= Melissa & Joey =

US television series

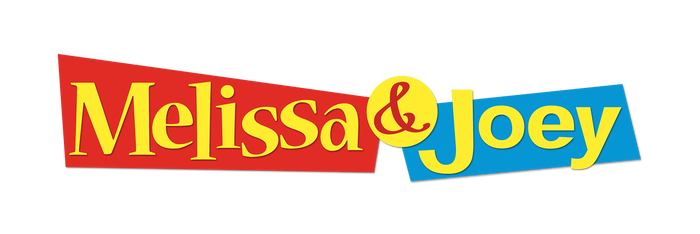
- Genre: Sitcom
- Created by: David Kendall & Bob Young
- Starring: Melissa Joan Hart; Joey Lawrence; Taylor Spreitler; Nick Robinson
- Theme music composer: Joey Lawrence & Matthew Gerrard
- Opening theme: "Stuck with Me", performed by Joey Lawrence
- Composers: Danny Lux; Michael Reola
- Country of origin: United States
- Original language: English
- No. of seasons: 4
- No. of episodes: 104 (list of episodes)

Production
- Executive producers: Paula Hart; David Kendall; Bob Young; Melissa Joan Hart; Joey Lawrence; John Ziffren; Seth Kurland
- Producers: Ken Ornstein; Brenda Hsueh; Sarah Jane Cunningham & Suzie V. Freeman; David Hartle
- Cinematography: Jim Roberson
- Editors: Peter Beyt; Andrew Chulack; Stuart Bass; Mark West
- Camera setup: Multi-camera
- Running time: 22 minutes
- Production companies: Hartbreak Films; JL Veritas

Original release
- Network: Freeform
- Release: August 17, 2010 – August 5, 2015

Melissa & Joey is an American television sitcom created by David Kendall and Bob Young, and starring Melissa Joan Hart and Joey Lawrence. It aired for four seasons between 2010 and 2015 on ABC Family (now Freeform). The series title reflects the actors' names, not their characters', as it follows local politician Melanie "Mel" Burke (Hart) and Joseph "Joe" Longo (Lawrence), whom Mel hires to look after her niece Lennox Scanlon (Taylor Spreitler) and nephew Ryder Scanlon (Nick Robinson) after a Ponzi scheme run by Mel's sister and brother-in-law leaves Joe broke.

The series was picked up originally for a pilot and season one containing 12 episodes – this premiered August 17, 2010. Then, due to the success of the show, ABC Family renewed it for 18 more episodes on October 8, 2010, which premiered June 29, 2011. The series was renewed by ABC Family for a second season of fifteen episodes, which began airing on May 30, 2012, and ended on August 29, 2012. During the second season, Melissa & Joey ranked as cable television's #1 telecast at 8 o'clock across target audiences 18–34, 18–49 and 12–34 demographics.

On August 17, 2012, ABC Family renewed Melissa & Joey for a third season, set to premiere on May 29, 2013. On May 28, 2013, ABC Family announced that the third season would be expanded by 20 episodes, and that the show had also been renewed for a fourth season, bringing the series total to 100 episodes.

The show proved to be quite successful for ABC Family as, in its third season, it established a 13-week high in total viewers, an eight-week high in viewers between the ages of 18–34 and 18–49 and a 15-week high in female viewers between the ages of 12–34. During the fourth season, the show reached a milestone of 100 episodes for syndication purposes but declined in the ratings. Along with most ABC Family shows, the declining number of viewers watching Melissa & Joey occurred in tandem with a general trend of reduced numbers of television network subscribers. Looking to marginalize these declines, the show accelerated the availability of its episodes to non-provider-authenticated ABC Family subscribers with Hulu Plus to three weeks post broadcast. On February 9, 2015, ABC Family announced its decision to end the series after four seasons. The series finale aired on August 5, 2015.

== Series overview ==
Mel is a local politician from a political family. When a family scandal leaves her niece, Lennox, and nephew, Ryder, without their parents, Mel takes them in. Meanwhile, Joe is a former commodities trader left bankrupt after a Ponzi scheme, and finds himself searching for a job. So when Mel finds it hard to handle an instant family and her own life, she hires Joe to become the family's nanny.

The show stars two former child and teen idols who were notable for roles they played in popular 1980s and 1990s sitcoms, Lawrence for Gimme a Break! and Blossom and Hart for Clarissa Explains It All and Sabrina, the Teenage Witch. Hart and Lawrence are both listed as executive producers of the series, and have each directed individual episodes.

== Episodes ==
Season	Episodes		Originally released	
Season	Episodes		First released	Last released
1	30	12	August 17, 2010	October 26, 2010
1	30	18	June 29, 2011	September 14, 2011
2	15		May 30, 2012	August 29, 2012
3	37		May 29, 2013	June 18, 2014
4	22	12	October 22, 2014	March 18, 2015
4	22	10	June 3, 2015	August 5, 2015

== Cast and characters ==
=== Main ===
- Melanie Alison "Mel" Burke (Melissa Joan Hart) is a city councilwoman in Toledo, Ohio (the youngest in the city's history, as Mel repeatedly brags). She is also a senator's daughter. Growing up, she was a rebellious, irresponsible party girl, and now she must take care of her niece and nephew after their mother (her sister, Meredith) was arrested for money laundering and their father disappeared to avoid arrest for running a Ponzi scheme. Over the course of season 3, she and Joe start dating in the mid-season episode "A Decent Proposal", becomes engaged in "Right Time, Right Place", and marry in the season finale, "At Last". She runs for Congress in season 4 and learns that she and Joe are having twins.
- Joseph Paul "Joe" Longo (Joey Lawrence) is a former executive and commodities trader with an MBA who lost his job, money and marriage in the wake of Mel's brother-in-law's Ponzi scheme and wound up living in his car. Seeing that Mel needed help raising her niece and nephew (and that he needed a job), he has agreed to be the live-in nanny/ house manager to assist Mel and give advice to the kids. He was born in a U.S. Army hospital in Uijeongbu, South Korea, and raised in Secaucus, New Jersey. He also has a brother named Tony who briefly dated Mel and a sister named Teresa. It was revealed he has a 13-year-old daughter named Dani (Jada Facer) with a woman named Felicia (Brooke Burke). Over the course of season 3, he and Mel start dating, get engaged, and marry. During season 4 he writes a book, which is published in the series finale, complete with an invitation to go on a book tour.
- Lennox Elizabeth Scanlon (Taylor Spreitler) is a free-spirited teenage girl who, at first, is against the idea of living with her aunt, but soon comes to terms with it. Lennox is known for her artsy, hipster style and extremely vocal liberal views and ideas. Her longest relationship thus far has been with Zander. They broke up when he left Ohio for school in Vermont and Lennox stayed in Toledo to attend the University of Toledo. They get back together, but then break up again after Zander finds out that Lennox had a relationship with Joe's nephew, Marco; then Zander slept with his roommate, keeping them apart. In the season 3 finale, she hooked up with Marco to forget about Zander, but continued their relationship afterwards and in the series finale she and Zander get engaged.
- Ryder Scanlon (Nick Robinson) is Mel's nephew, and the youngest in the household. In the series pilot, it is mentioned that he suffered a nervous breakdown and burned his father's suits in the driveway. Like many teenage boys his age, he enjoys watching television and playing sports and chasing girls. Lennox often makes jabs at her brother for being a "nerd", but it is not clear if this is true or just a brother-sister teasing relationship. Ryder is suspended from school in Season 3 for smoking marijuana on a school trip. In Season 4 he joins the Navy and is stationed in Portsmouth, Virginia.

=== Recurring ===
- Stephanie Krause (Lucy DeVito) is Mel's legislative assistant and former intern, beginning with episode 7. Hyperactive and fiercely loyal, Stephanie is keen to schedule interviews, photo opportunities, and media coverage for Mel. She regularly exhibits that she has a crush on Joe.
- Rhonda Cheng (Elizabeth Ho) is Mel's press secretary appearing in 5 of the 6 first episodes. She's a giddy yet loyal friend to her and always gives her dating and/or parenting advice.
- Tiffany Longo (Megan Hilty) is Joe's former wife, first seen in episode 13. Their on-again, off-again relationship is punctuated by bouts of lovemaking in unusual places.
- Holly Rebeck (Rachel G. Fox) is Ryder's extremely aggressive, controlling girlfriend. She is often manipulative, jealous, and conceited, and Ryder is usually submissive to her demands. Later on, she gets help with her "controlling" issues, though sometimes she can't help but be a bit demanding. She broke up with Ryder in the beginning of the third season after she found out he smoked pot on the school trip.
- George Karpelos, Jr. (Scott Michael Foster) is Mel's 24-year-old lover, starting with episode 21. He is an independent business entrepreneur who loves bicycling. Their relationship is put on hold when George moves to Italy for business, and later, Mel breaks it off.
- Roman Maizes (Chris Brochu), a nerd and Lennox's boyfriend in the first season.
- Russell Burke (Christopher Rich) is Mel's father, the former Senator of Ohio, who is very indulgent to his grandchildren and tends to undermine Mel's authority with them. He left his wife Monica for a 28-year-old yoga instructor but returns to his wife when Mel informs the yoga instructor that her father had a vasectomy.
- Elena Romanov (Anya Monzikova) is a Russian businesswoman whom Joe marries at the end of the second season. Their marriage ends when she moves back to Russia to testify for an old colleague.
- Leo Larbeck (Joel McKinnon Miller), the friendly contractor who helped Mel and Joe remodel the house in the beginning of the second season.
- Jackie (Christine Lakin), Mel's best friend from college, who is her only other single friend. She plans to get a sperm donor to have a baby without having to marry someone, and Mel unwittingly leads her to purchase Joey's sperm.
- Haskell Davis (Gregg Sulkin), Lennox's boyfriend in the second season.
- Aidan Haber (Cody Linley), the president of the Spirit Committee at Lennox and Ryder's school. Became romantically involved with Lennox in the second season.
- Monica Burke (Rita Rudner), Mel's neurotic mother who gets back together with her husband Russell after Mel ruins his relationship with his mistress by telling her about his vasectomy.
- Austin (Trevor Donovan) is Mel's childhood friend who is back in town.
- Noah (Justin Hartley) Mel's boyfriend in season 3, who temporarily moves in with her after his apartment floods.
- Zander Carlson (Sterling Knight), Lennox's boyfriend in the third and fourth season. He is also a talented artist, and provides illustrations for Lennox's web series "Cassandra". After a car accident, Zander and Lennox decided to take their relationship to the next level and got engaged in the series finale.
- Keira (Sadie Calvano), Ryder's girlfriend in the third season.
- Dani Mancini (Jada Facer), Joey's long-lost daughter, revealed in late season three. She decided to live with Joey and Mel while her mother goes on tour. After her mother returned, Dani moved back with her, but still keeps in touch with Joey and Mel.
- Felicia Mancini (Brooke Burke), Dani's mother who works as a professional band massager.
- Anthony "Tony" Longo (Matthew Lawrence), Joe's younger brother. Actor Matthew Lawrence and Joey Lawrence are brothers.
- Marco (Kevin Fonteyne) Joey's nephew and Lennox's ex-boyfriend who she dumped when he left for Japan for six months.
- McKenna Cederstrom (Greer Grammer), an aspiring actress whom Lennox and Zander hire for the role of "Cassandra" in their film. She and Zander become romantically involved, until realizing he still loves Lennox.
- Noelle (Hayley Erin), Lennox's friend who develops a crush on Ryder.

== Development and production ==
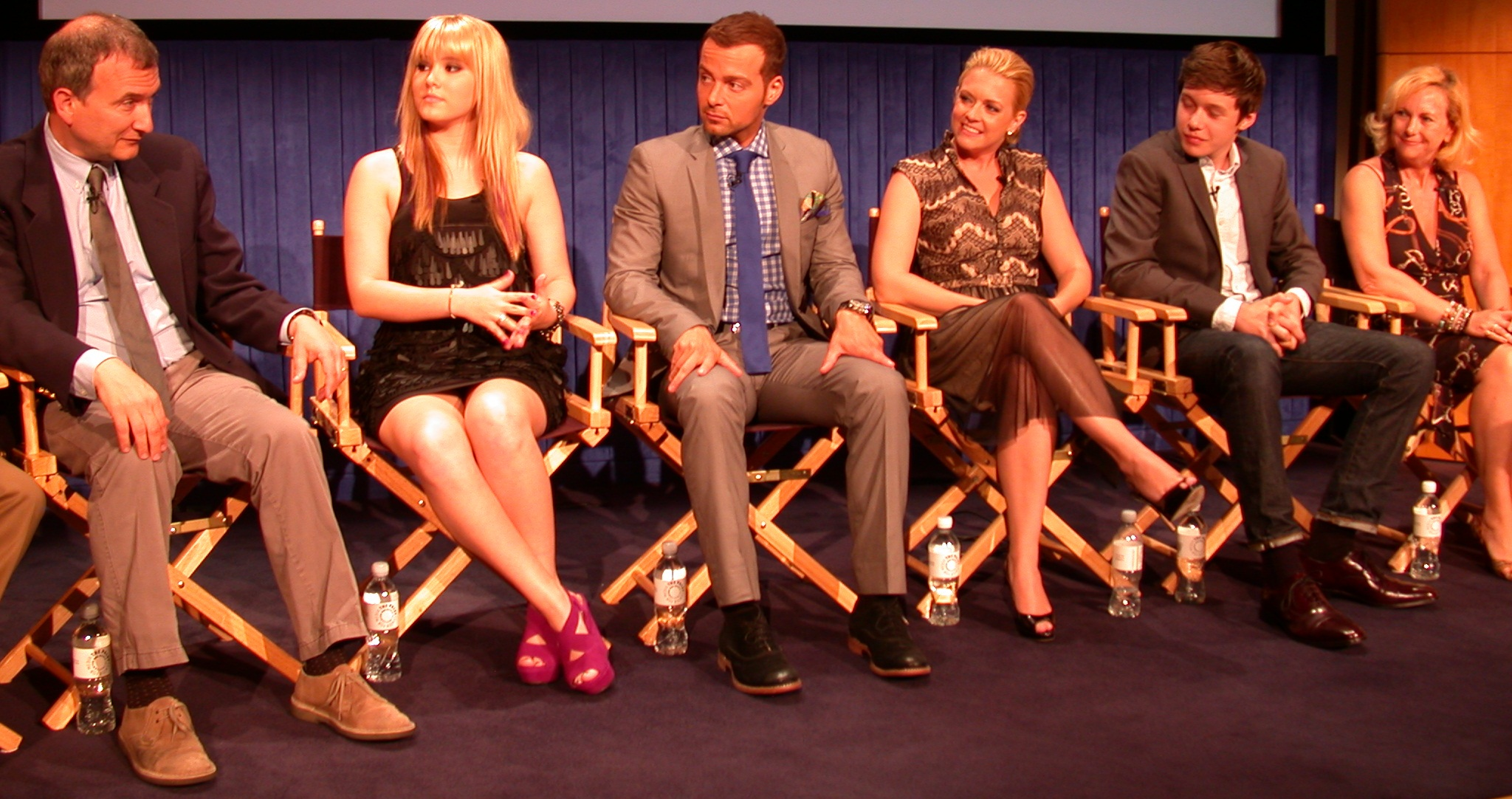
The cast and crew of Melissa & Joey

The series marks the second time Hart and Lawrence have co-starred together in an ABC Family production; their first was the 2009 television film, My Fake Fiance. Melissa & Joey was criticized early on for lacking sufficient chemistry between the leads and a "will they, won't they" theme present in their earlier project, My Fake Fiance.

On October 8, 2010, ABC Family announced their order of an additional 20 episodes for the first season, creating a season of 30 episodes. The mid-season finale for season one aired on October 26, 2010. The second half of the first season began airing on June 29, 2011. On July 11, 2011, ABC Family announced that Melissa & Joey had been picked up for a second season. On August 17, 2012, ABC Family announced that Melissa & Joey had been picked up for a third season.

Both Lawrence and Hart directed episodes in season two. Lawrence's episode is called "Wherefore Art Thou Lennox" and Hart was the first woman to direct an episode of the series.

The series was filmed before a live studio audience at CBS Studio Center stage 14. The house used for exteriors is located in the Hancock Park area of Los Angeles.

On February 9, 2015, ABC Family announced its decision to end the series after four seasons.

== Broadcast ==
Melissa & Joey premiered on STAR World India on October 6, 2011. In Southeast Asia, it premiered on STAR World in 2011. In the United Kingdom, all episodes were put on Sky On Demand on July 1, 2014 and began airing on E4 on July 28, 2014.

== Home media ==
On May 24, 2011, Shout! Factory released Melissa & Joey: Season One, Part One on DVD in Region 1. Special features include a sneak peek of the remaining season 1 episodes, bloopers, and featurettes with Melissa Joan Hart and Joey Lawrence. On October 4, 2011, Shout! Factory released Melissa & Joey: Season One, Part Two on DVD in Region 1, collecting the final 18 episodes of season one in a 2-disc set.

== Reception ==
=== Critical reception ===
On the review aggregator website Rotten Tomatoes, first season holds an approval rating of 45% based on 11 reviews, with an average rating of 6.50/10. On Metacritic, the first season of the show holds a score 53 out of 100 based on reviews from 9 critics, indicating "mixed or average reviews".

=== Ratings ===
The show stood as Wednesday's #1 cable TV telecast at 8 o'clock in Adults 18–34, Women 18–34, Women 18–49 and Females 12–34 Demographics. The show continued to dominate its cable time period during its second season, ranking #1 across key measures Adults 18–34, Women 18–34, Adults 18–49, Women 18–49, Viewers 12–34 and Females 12–34.

The following is a table with the average estimated number of viewers per episode, each season of Melissa & Joey on ABC Family.

Season	Timeslot (ET/PT)	No. of episodes	Premiere			Finale		
Season	Timeslot (ET/PT)	No. of episodes	Date	Premiere viewers (in millions)	18–49 rating	Date	Finale viewers (in millions)	18–49 Rating
1	Tuesday 8:00PM	12	August 17, 2010	2.15	1.0	October 26, 2010	1.38	0.6
1	Wednesday 8:00PM	18	June 29, 2011	1.54	0.6	September 14, 2011	1.39	0.7
2	Wednesday 8:00PM	15	May 30, 2012	1.21	0.7	August 29, 2012	1.50	0.7
3	Wednesday 8:00PM	37	May 29, 2013	0.97	0.5	June 18, 2014	1.29	0.6
4	Wednesday 8:00PM	22	October 22, 2014	1.19	0.6	August 5, 2015	0.94	0.4

Melissa & Joey : U.S. viewers per episode (millions)
Audience measurement performed by Nielsen Media Research

=== Accolades ===
Year	Award	Category	Nominee(s)	Result	Ref.
2013	People's Choice Awards	Favorite Cable TV Comedy	Melissa & Joey	Nominated	
2014	People's Choice Awards	Favorite Cable TV Comedy	Melissa & Joey	Nominated	
2015	People's Choice Awards	Favorite Cable TV Comedy	Melissa & Joey	Won	
2015	Women's Image Network Awards	Outstanding Actress Comedy Series	Melissa Joan Hart	Nominated	
2015	Young Artist Awards	Best Performance in a TV Drama Series - Guest Starring Young Actress 14 - 16	Johnnie Ladd	Won	
