= Cold War (band) =

American band

- Origin: Orange County, California, United States
- Genres: Metalcore, hardcore punk
- Years active: 2002–present
- Labels: Indecision Records
- Members: Steve Helferich; Justin Jolley; Geoff Harman; Chris Thomson; Marc Jackson
- Past members: Kirk Katlan; Jeff "Tyrone" Trion "The Rookie"
- Website: Official website

Cold War is an American band from Orange County, California, United States, who are signed to notable independent hardcore specialist label, Indecision Records. Their music is described variably as metalcore, hardcore punk and melodic death metal. They have released two albums on this label.

The band's first album was From Russia With Love, where they play tribute to their heavy metal influences by covering Iron Maiden's "The Trooper". The band's sound is influenced by singer Steve Helferich, who worked in Sweden with his previous band, Welcome To Your Life, and parts of the band's instrument tracking were done in Gothenburg, Sweden.

== History ==
The band was formed in early 2002, by Kirk Katlan, Steve Helferich (ex-Welcome To Your Life), Marc Jackson (ex-Throwdown), Geoff Harman (ex-Scars Of Tomorrow) and Jeff "Tyrone" Trion (ex-Show Of Hands). Justin Jolley replaced Kirk Katlan soon after and between May and July 2004, the band entered the studio to record their debut record on Indecision Records, From Russia With Love. It was released in November 2004. The band also credit "The Rookie" as supplying samples for the album, which basically consisted of background noises and film excerpts to add to the overall sound of the music.

Shortly after the release, Jeff Trion left and formed a band called Rebel Fever. He was replaced by Chris Thomson (ex-Atreyu), and in 2007, a second album, Espionage Made Easy, was released.

== Personnel ==
=== Current members ===
- Steve Helferich – vocals (2002 – present)
- Justin Jolley – guitar (2003 – present)
- Geoff Harman – guitar (2002 – present)
- Chris Thomson – bass (2004 – present)
- Marc Jackson – drums (2002 – present)

=== Previous members ===
- Kirk Katlan – guitar (2002)
- Jeff "Tyrone" Trion – bass (2002 – 2004)
- The Rookie – samples

== Discography ==
- From Russia with Love (November 2004) Indecision Records
- Espionage Made Easy (May 2007) Indecision
