= Sun Records (TV series) =

Television series

- Genre: Drama
- Directed by: Roland Joffé
- Starring: Chad Michael Murray; Margaret Anne Florence; Keir O'Donnell; Drake Milligan; Kevin Fonteyne; Christian Lees; Jennifer Holland; Trevor Donovan; Billy Gardell; Leo Goff
- Country of origin: United States
- Original language: English
- No. of seasons: 1
- No. of episodes: 8

Production
- Executive producers: Leslie Greif; Gil Grant; Barry Berg; Jayson Dinsmore; Julia Silverton
- Producers: Herb Nanas; Colin Escott
- Camera setup: Single-camera
- Production company: Thinkfactory Media

Original release
- Network: CMT
- Release: February 23 – April 13, 2017

Sun Records is an American drama television miniseries based on the musical Million Dollar Quartet written by Colin Escott and Floyd Mutrux. The series takes place at the Sun Studio in Memphis and stars Drake Milligan, Trevor Donovan, Kevin Fonteyne, Christian Lees, Dustin Ingram, Billy Gardell, Jonah Lees, Chad Michael Murray, Leo Goff, and Jennifer Holland. The series premiered on CMT on February 23, 2017, and concluded on April 13, 2017.

== Cast ==
- Drake Milligan as Elvis Presley
- Trevor Donovan as Eddy Arnold
- Pokey LaFarge as Hank Snow
- Kevin Fonteyne as Johnny Cash
- Christian Lees as Jerry Lee Lewis
- Dustin Ingram as Carl Perkins
- Billy Gardell as Colonel Tom Parker
- Jonah Lees as Jimmy Swaggart
- Chad Michael Murray as Sam Phillips
- Jennifer Holland as Becky Phillips
- Margaret Anne Florence as Marion Keisker
- Keir O'Donnell as Dewey Phillips
- Kerry Holliday as Ike Turner
- Justin Estabrook as Ticket Taker
- Ann Mahoney as Gladys Presley
- Darius Rucker as Johnny Bragg
- Johnny Holiday "Kid Memphis" as Luther Perkins
- Leo Goff as Froggy
- AlexAnn Hopkins as Trixie

== Episodes ==
No.	Title	Directed by	Written by	Original release date	Prod. code	U.S. viewers (millions)
1	"706 Union"	Roland Joffé	Leslie Greif & Colin Escott	February 23, 2017	101	0.97
2	"Outta the Groove"	Roland Joffé	Colin Escott & Leslie Greif	March 2, 2017	102	0.64
3	"Record Man Blues"	Roland Joffé	Story by : Leslie Greif & Colin Escott; Teleplay by : Gail Gilchriest	March 9, 2017	103	0.56
4	"Never Better"	Roland Joffé	Story by : Colin Escott & Leslie Greif; Teleplay by : Gail Gilchriest	March 16, 2017	104	0.53
5	"Rising Sun"	Roland Joffé	Story by : Colin Escott & Leslie Greif; Teleplay by : Gil Grant & Charles Heit	March 23, 2017	105	0.49
6	"Who They Were Meant to Be"	Roland Joffé	Leslie Greif & Colin Escott	March 30, 2017	106	0.51
7	"No Favors Here"	Roland Joffé	Story by : Colin Escott; Teleplay by : Gail Gilchriest	April 6, 2017	107	0.52
8	"Finishing School"	Roland Joffé	Leslie Greif & Colin Escott	April 13, 2017	108	0.46

== Reception ==
=== Critical response ===
Sun Records has received mixed to positive reviews from television critics. On Rotten Tomatoes the season has a rating of 60%, based on 10 reviews. On Metacritic, the season has a score of 65 out of 100, based on 8 critics, indicating "generally favorable reviews".

=== Ratings ===
Viewership and ratings per episode of Sun Records
No.	Title	Air date	Rating/share (18–49)	Viewers (millions)	DVR (18–49)	DVR viewers (millions)	Total (18–49)	Total viewers (millions)
1	"706 Union"	February 23, 2017	0.2	0.97	—N/a	—N/a	—N/a	—N/a
2	"Outta The Groove"	March 2, 2017	0.2	0.64	—N/a	—N/a	—N/a	—N/a
3	"Record Man Blues"	March 9, 2017	0.1	0.56	0.2	0.74	0.3	1.30
4	"Never Better"	March 16, 2017	0.1	0.53	0.2	0.66	0.3	1.19
5	"Rising Sun"	March 23, 2017	0.1	0.49	0.2	0.70	0.3	1.19
6	"Who They Were Meant To Be"	March 30, 2017	0.1	0.51	0.2	0.71	0.3	1.22
7	"No Favors Here"	April 6, 2017	0.1	0.52	0.2	0.66	0.3	1.18
8	"Finishing School"	April 13, 2017	0.1	0.46	0.2	0.70	0.3	1.16
