= Kid Memphis =

American musician

Johnny Holiday
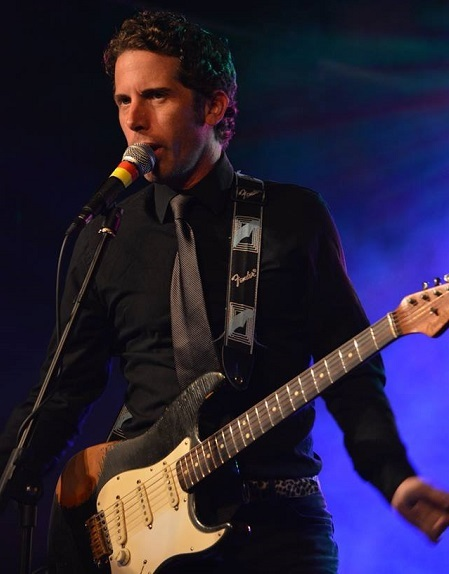
- Born: Johnny Holiday; Memphis, Tennessee, United States

John "Johnny" Holiday is an American musician, writer, and actor. As Kid Memphis, he is the lead musician of the Kid Memphis and The Mojo Hand Band. He played Carl Perkins in the Johnny Cash bio movie Walk the Line starring Joaquin Phoenix and Reese Witherspoon.

== Early life, family and education ==
John Holiday was born in Memphis, Tennessee, US.

== Career ==
His first appearance on stage was at the Overton Park Shell. As a rock and blues musician, Johnny made his mark on Beale Street in Memphis at age 15. His first record made was at Sun Studio. When Beale Street opened as a tourist attraction in the 1980s, a very young Johnny along with his band Kid Memphis & The Mojo Hand Band started performing regularly at the New Daisy Theater. Shortly after that, Johnny had played alongside musicians such as, B.B. King, Albert King, Albert Collins, Gatemouth Brown, Anson Funderburgh, Willie "Big Eyes" Smith, Cash McCall, Jeff Healey and more. Johnny was reportedly influenced by some of T-bone Walker's early Texas recordings.

He has released a record with Little Boys Blue on Vizztone Records, operated by Bob Margolin. In 2020, Holiday released a record via Retrofonic, recorded at American Sound Studio.

Holiday became an actor in 2005.

== See also ==
- Sun Records (TV series)
