= To Russia with Love (album) =

Studio album by Mannheim Steamroller
- Released: July 27, 1994
- Recorded: February – April 24, 1994
- Venue: St. Petersburg Philharmonia
- Genre: New-age music
- Length: 46:01
- Label: American Gramaphone
- Producer: Chip Davis

Mannheim Steamroller chronology
Fresh Aire 7 (1990)	To Russia with Love (1994)	Christmas in the Aire (1995)

Professional ratings
Review scores
Source	Rating
Allmusic	3/5 stars

To Russia with Love is a 1994 album by Mannheim Steamroller, composed for the 1994 Goodwill Games. The album was recorded in St. Petersburg Philharmonia Hall.

"Chakra III" originally appeared on Mannheim Steamroller's previous album, Fresh Aire 7. "Fugue" originally appeared on Chip Davis' 1993 release, Impressions.

== Track listing ==
All tracks are written by Chip Davis.

No.	Title	Length
1.	"The Goodwill Games"	4:24
2.	"Ruslan and Ljudmila"	5:14
3.	"Melodie"	1:38
4.	"Let's Go Home"	1:04
5.	"Dancing Flames"	6:34
6.	"Troika from Lieutenant Kizheh"	2:51
7.	"The Goose from Smolensk"	2:04
8.	"Chakra 3 (The 7 Chakras Of The Body)"	3:21
9.	"The Smolny Fanfare"	0:29
10.	"The Marche Miniature"	2:17
11.	"Fugue"	4:15
12.	"Bird in the Garden"	2:25
13.	"The Great Gate of Kiev"	6:02
14.	"The Anthems"	3:26
Total length:		46:01
