= Jada Facer =

American singer-songwriter

- Born: Jada Mae Facer; St. George, Utah, U.S.
- Occupations: Actress; singer
- Years active: 2011–present
- Known for: Melissa & Joey

Jada Mae Facer is an American actress and singer. She played the recurring role of Joe's daughter, Dani, on the sitcom Melissa & Joey from 2014 to 2015. She has a YouTube channel and as of April 10, 2026, she has over 292 million views and over 1.42 million subscribers.

== Life and career ==
Facer was born in St. George, Utah, where she first became interested in acting after failing to be cast in a local production of Annie and subsequently trying out for a New York City production. The family later moved to Los Angeles, where she signed with an agency. Her older brother is actor Kyson Facer from Nickelodeon's I Am Frankie.

Her first major role was in the TV movie Love's Christmas Journey in 2011, in which she played the role of Annabelle. For this role, she won the Young Artist Award for Best Leading Young Actress in a TV Movie, Miniseries or Special.

She was also nominated for the Young Artist Award for Best Young Actress Ten and Under in a Short Film for her performance in the 2012 short film Nina Del Tango.

From 2014 to 2015, Facer played Joe's daughter, Dani, on the ABC Family sitcom Melissa & Joey.

She has appeared on a number of other TV shows including ABC's Mistresses, CBS's Bad Teacher, and Nickelodeon's Henry Danger.

Facer is also a singer-songwriter, saying in 2015 that she was inspired by Taylor Swift.

== Filmography ==
=== Film ===
Year	Title	Role	Notes
2011	Love's Christmas Journey	Annabelle Davis	TV movie
2013	Beauty and the Least: The Misadventures of Ben Banks	Mormon Girl	uncredited
2012	One Bad Thing	Katie	Short
2012	Niña del Tango	Lucy Bird	Short

=== Television ===
Year	Title	Role	Notes
2014	Mistresses	Peyton	Episode: "i want to kms"
2014–2015	Melissa & Joey	Dani	Recurring role (seasons 3–4), 10 episodes
2015	Henry Danger	Courtney Sham	Episode: "Jasper's Real Girlfriend"
2016	The Thundermans	Candi Falconman	Episode: "Thundermans: Banished!"
2017	The Mick	Olivia	Episode: "The Sleepover"
