= Kevin Fonteyne =

American actor (born 1990)

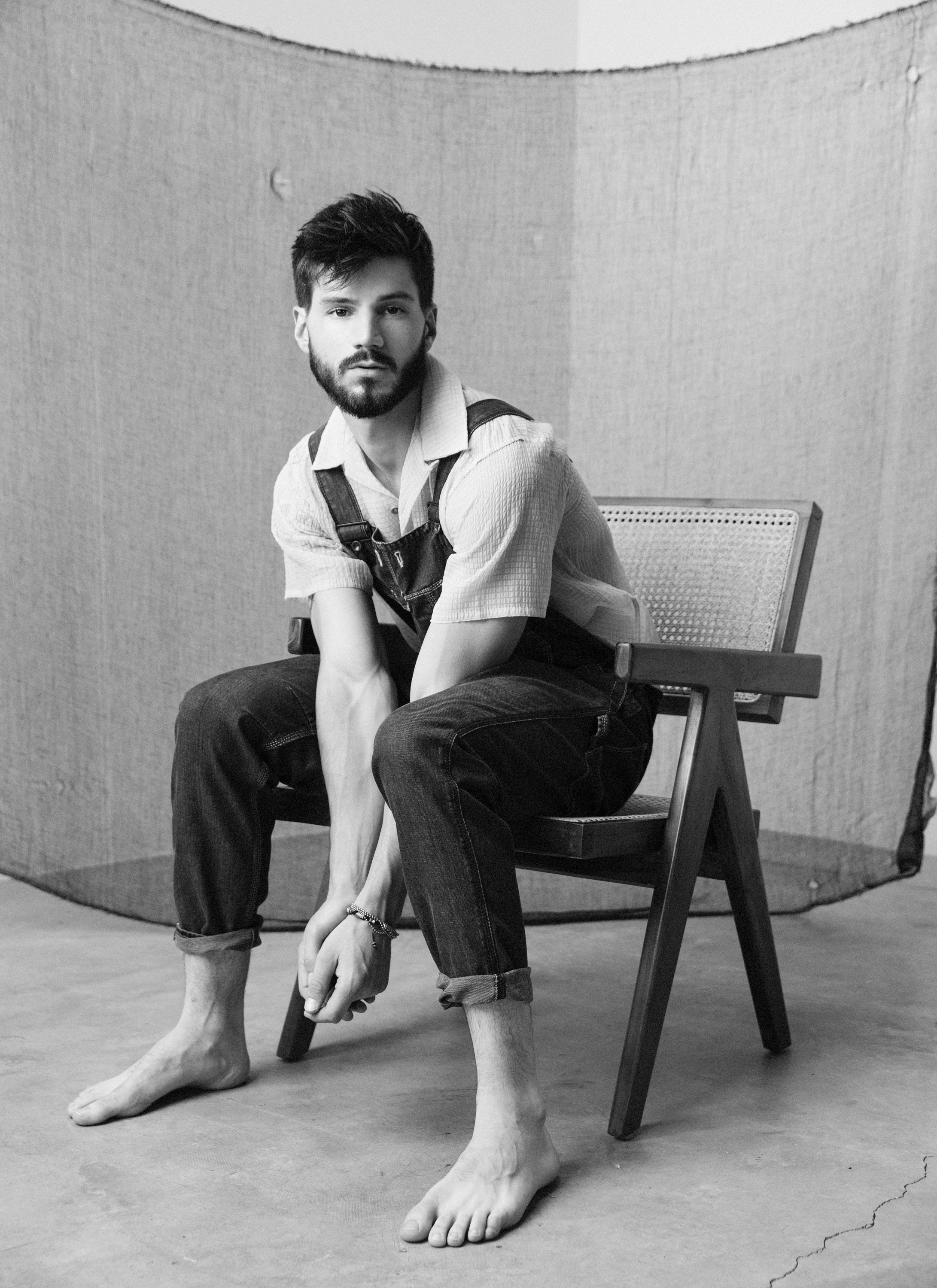
- Born: June 14, 1990 (age 36); San Antonio, Texas, U.S.
- Occupation: Actor

Kevin Fonteyne (born June 14, 1990) is an American actor from Portsmouth, New Hampshire. He is best known for portraying Marco on Melissa & Joey and Johnny Cash on Sun Records.

== Biography ==
Kevin was one of six children in a single-parent home. His mother is a retired Air Force military medical Senior Master Sergeant. He started acting at a young age, starring in school plays at Hallsville Elementary School in Manchester, New Hampshire. He graduated from Portsmouth High School in 2008. His TV career began with roles on iCarly, Criminal Minds, Monday Mornings, Bones, and NCIS. This led to larger roles like Matt on Masters of Sex and Marco on Melissa & Joey. When not acting, Kevin enjoys playing guitar, singing, and training his new pup Zeus. He currently resides in Los Angeles.

== Filmography ==
=== Television ===
Year	Title	Role	Notes
2009	iCarly	Austin	Episode: "iSpeed Date"
2011	Criminal Minds	Josh Redding	Episode: "Self Fulfilling Prophecy"
2013	Monday Mornings	Derrick Wells	Episode: "Wheels within Wheels"
2015	NCIS	Boyfriend at Diner	Episode: "Troll"
2013-2015	Melissa & Joey	Marco	Guest star: 10 episodes
2015	Masters of Sex	Matt	Guest Star: 3 episodes
2015	Bones	Victor Cornacchio	Episode: "The Promise in the Palace"
2017	Sun Records	Johnny Cash	Main Cast: 8 episodes
2018	The Lover in the Attic: A True Story	Otto	
