= From Russia with Love (Cold War album) =

Studio album by Cold War
- Released: November 2004
- Recorded: May 2004 – July 2004 at JATS Studios in Ponderosa Mobile Estates
- Genre: Metalcore
- Length: 52:17
- Label: Indecision
- Producer: Cold War

Cold War chronology
| From Russia with Love (2004) | Espionage Made Easy (2007) |

From Russia with Love is the first album by metalcore band, Cold War. It was recorded between May and July 2004 and released on Indecision Records in November 2004.

Professional ratings
Review scores
| Source | Rating |
|---|---|
| Aversion Online | (Favorable) link |

== Overview ==
The band made use of sound effects and cinematic excerpts in the recording of this album, as opposed to sampling other artist's songs.

It is characterized by its harsh hardcore vocal style and brutal, but often melodic and somewhat technical, guitar work. The lyrics can be described as typically hardcore, that is to say politically and socially aware in contrast to the fantasy imagery often employed by heavy metal bands.

== Track listing ==
- All tracks written by Cold War
1. "Love Betrays" – 5:43
2. "Make Your Mark" – 4:17
3. "Fuck The Game" – 4:30
4. "We Are All Going To Hell" – 3:37
5. "Painful Delight" – 4:10
6. "Bombs Away" – 5:01
7. "What You Deserve" – 5:34
8. "Retrace My Steps" – 3:59
9. "Scars Left As Evidence" – 4:45
10. "One Chance" – 10:41
- The track "One Chance" is only actually 5:52, but at 6:52 a hidden track, a cover of Iron Maiden's "The Trooper", starts.

== Credits ==
- Steve Helferich – vocals
- Justin Jolley – guitar
- Geoff Harman – guitar
- Jeff "Tyrone" Tryon – bass
- Marc Jackson – drums
- The Rookie – samples
- Death By Stereo's Jim Miner provided additional guitar work along with Justin Sturm.
- Additional vocals on Track #7 provided by David Richards.
- Recorded at Victoria Street Studios
- Engineered and mixed by Justin Sturm
- Mastered by Paul Miner at Q-Mark
