= List of Teekyu episodes =

Teekyu is an anime series directed and written by Shin Itagaki, based upon a manga distributed in Earth Star Entertainment's Comic Earth Star. The anime has had nine seasons, starting in October 2012. The adaptation was announced alongside the release of the manga's first tankōbon, five months after the manga was first published. This is the fastest manga-release-to-anime-announcement time that Earth Star Entertainment has ever had.

The first three seasons are animated by MAPPA. The series' first season aired between October 7 and December 23, 2012, the second one between July 7 and September 22, 2013, and the third one between October 6 and December 22, 2013. The fourth and fifth seasons, along with spinoff Takamiya Nasuno Desu! ("I am Nasuno Takamiya"), are produced by Millepensee. The fourth season and spinoff both aired from April 6 to June 22, 2015. The fifth season of Teekyu aired from July 6, 2015, to September 21, 2015. The sixth season aired from October 5, 2015, to December 21, 2015. The anime has been renewed for a 7th season in January 2016. Season 8 of Teekyū ran from on October 5, 2016, to December 21, 2016. A 9th season has been announced and aired from July to September 2017.

All seasons aired on Tokyo MX and AT-X with the third and later seasons also airing on Sun Television and the first one streamed on Niconico. All seasons have also been simulcasted by Crunchyroll. The first season was released on Blu-ray Disc and DVD on February 22, 2013. The second and third seasons were released on Blu-ray Disc on October 25, 2013, and January 24, 2014, respectively, along with two OVA episodes each. The fourth season and the Takamiya Nasuno Desu! spinoff were released on Blu-ray Disc on August 28, 2015, with the fifth season released on Blu-Ray disc on November 27, 2015.

== Series overview ==
Season	Episodes	Originally released	
Season	Episodes	First released	Last released
1	12	October 7, 2012	December 23, 2012
2	12	July 7, 2013	September 22, 2013
3	12	October 6, 2013	December 22, 2013
4	12	April 6, 2015	June 22, 2015
5	12	July 6, 2015	September 21, 2015
6	12	October 5, 2015	December 21, 2015
7	12	January 12, 2016	March 29, 2016
8	12	October 5, 2016	December 21, 2016
9	12	July 12, 2017	September 27, 2017

== Theme songs ==
Each season makes use of one theme song.

- Season 1 - "Botsuraku Kizoku no Tame no Teekyu" (没落貴族のためのてーきゅう), sung by Yui Watanabe, lyrics by Roots and music by Hakkai Watanabe
- Season 2 - "Menimeni Manimani" (メニメニマニマニ), sung by Kyōko Narumi, written and arranged by Yashikin
- Season 3 - "Nufutto Teekyu Potlatch" (ぬふっとてーきゅうポトラッチ), sung by Naive, lyrics by Roots, music and arranged by Harukichi Yamamoto
- Best Selection
  - Opening Theme - "Koyoi Festival" (今宵フェスティバブル), sung by Kyōko Narumi, written and arranged by Yashikin
  - Ending Theme - "Yūgure After" (夕暮アフター), sung by Kyōko Narumi, written and arranged by Yashikin
- Season 4 - "Fa tto Shite Tōgenkyō" (ファッとして桃源郷), sung by Suzuko Mimori, written and arranged by Yashikin
- Season 5 - "Qunka!", sung by Kana Hanazawa, written and arranged by Yashikin
- Takamiya Nasuno Desu! - "Ōgon no Kinderella ~Gozen 0-ji ni Mahou wa Tokezu~" (黄金のキンデレラ ～午前0時に魔法は解けず～), sung by Kyōko Narumi, written and arranged by Yashakin
- Season 6 - "Tottemo Safari" (とってもサファリ), sung by Earth Star Dream, written and arranged by Yashakin
- Season 7 - "Tsuppari-kun vs. Sekitori-man" (ツッパリくんvs関取マン), sung by Yui Watanabe, Suzuko Mimori, Kyōko Narumi and Hanazawa Kana, written and arranged by Yashakin
- Usakame
  - Opening Theme - "Hashire! Usakame Kōkō Tennis Bu" (走れ! うさかめ高校テニス部!!), sung by Yuki Nakashima, Hikaru Koide, Izumi Nakaida and Maria Tanijiri, written by Daisuke Kan and arranged by Yūki Kishida
  - Ending Theme - Promise you, sung by Earth Star Dream, lyrics by Yoshie Isogai, music by Takamitsu Ono and arranged by Chihiro Tamaki
- Season 8
  - Episode 85, 86, 89, 91, 93 and 95 - "Gluten Elegy" (グルテン哀歌, Gukuren Erejī), sung by Kaori Ishihara, written and arranged by Kentarō Sonoda
  - Episode 87, 88, 90, 92, 94 and 96 - "Nihongo Wakarimasen" (ニホンゴワカリマセン), sung by Yui Ogura, written and arranged by Kentarō Sonoda
- Season 9
  - Opening Theme - "Dream First Sensation!" (ドリーム・ファースト・宣誓しょん！), sung by Yui Watanabe, written by and arranged by Takuya Ōhata
  - Ending Theme - "Kaiun! Shukufuku! Entenka" (開運！招福！炎天歌), sung by Earth Star Dream, lyrics by Nagae Kuwahara, music and arranged by Cher Watanabe

== Season 1 ==
Subtitle is a setting that has been quoted from the movie that Kanae saw the day before.

No.	Title	Original release date
1	"Forrest Gump with Senpai"; Transliteration: "Senpai to Ichigoichie" (Japanese: 先輩と一期一会)	October 7, 2012
2	"Pirates of the Caribbean with Senpai"; Transliteration: "Senpai to Karibian" (Japanese: 先輩とカリビアン)	October 14, 2012
3	"Gold Rush with Senpai"; Transliteration: "Senpai to Ōgonkyō Jidai" (Japanese: 先輩と黄金狂時代)	October 21, 2012
4	"Goonies with Senpai"; Transliteration: "Senpai to Gūnīzu" (Japanese: 先輩とグーニーズ)	October 28, 2012
5	"Exit Wounds with Senpai"; Transliteration: "Senpai to Dengeki" (Japanese: 先輩とDENGEKI)	November 4, 2012
6	"Waterworld with Senpai"; Transliteration: "Senpai to Wōtā Wārudo" (Japanese: 先輩とウォーターワールド)	November 11, 2012
7	"From Russia with Love with Senpai"; Transliteration: "Senpai to Roshia yori Ai o Komete" (Japanese: 先輩とロシアより愛をこめて)	November 18, 2012
8	"Born on the Fourth of July with Senpai"; Transliteration: "Senpai to Shichi-Gatsu Yon-Nichi ni Umarete" (Japanese: 先輩と7月4日に生まれて)	November 25, 2012
9	"Dinner Rush with Senpai"; Transliteration: "Senpai to Dinā Rasshu" (Japanese: 先輩とディナーラッシュ)	December 2, 2012
10	"Up the Creek with Senpai"; Transliteration: "Senpai to Uhauha Zabūn" (Japanese: 先輩とウハウハザブーン)	December 9, 2012
11	"Nacho Libre with Senpai"; Transliteration: "Senpai to Nacho Ribure" (Japanese: 先輩とナチョ・リブレ)	December 16, 2012
12	"The Sixth Sense with Senpai"; Transliteration: "Senpai to Shikkusu Sensu" (Japanese: 先輩とシックスセンス)	December 23, 2012

== Season 2 ==
No.	Title	Original release date
13	"Full Metal Jacket with Senpai"; Transliteration: "Senpai to Furumetaru Jaketto" (Japanese: 先輩とフルメタルジャケット)	July 7, 2013
14	"We Were Soldiers with Senpai"; Transliteration: "Senpai to Wansu ando Fōebā" (Japanese: 先輩とワンス・アンド・フォーエバー)	July 14, 2013
15	"Transformers with Senpai"; Transliteration: "Senpai to Toransufōmā" (Japanese: 先輩とトランスフォーマー)	July 21, 2013
16	"Ping Pong with Senpai"; Transliteration: "Senpai to Pinpon" (Japanese: 先輩とピンポン)	July 28, 2013
17	"Mars Attacks with Senpai"; Transliteration: "Senpai to Māzu Atakku" (Japanese: 先輩とマーズ・アタック)	August 4, 2013
18	"Evolution with Senpai"; Transliteration: "Senpai to Eboryūshon" (Japanese: 先輩とエボリューション)	August 11, 2013
19	"Run Lola Run with Senpai"; Transliteration: "Senpai to Ran Rōra Ran" (Japanese: 先輩とラン・ローラ・ラン)	August 18, 2013
20	"Cider House Rules with Senpai"; Transliteration: "Senpai to Saidā Hausu Rūru" (Japanese: 先輩とサイダーハウス・ルール)	August 25, 2013
21	"Major League with Senpai"; Transliteration: "Senpai to Mejā Rīgu" (Japanese: 先輩とメジャーリーグ)	September 1, 2013
22	"Field of Dreams with Senpai"; Transliteration: "Senpai to Fīrudo obu Dorīmuzu" (Japanese: 先輩とフィールド・オブ・ドリームス)	September 8, 2013
23	"E.T. with Senpai"; Transliteration: "Senpai to E.T." (Japanese: 先輩とE.T.)	September 15, 2013
24	"Ratatouille with Senpai"; Transliteration: "Senpai to Oishii Resutoran" (Japanese: 先輩とおいしいレストラン)	September 22, 2013
OVA–1	"Charlie and the Chocolate Factory with Senpai"; Transliteration: "Senpai to Chokorēto Kōjō" (Japanese: 先輩とチョコレート工場)	October 25, 2013
OVA–2	"Spirited Away with Senpai"; Transliteration: "Senpai to Chihiro no Kamikakushi" (Japanese: 先輩と千尋の神隠し)	October 25, 2013

== Season 3 ==
No.	Title	Original release date
25	"The World is Not Enough with Senpai"; Transliteration: "Senpai to Wārudo izu Notto Inafu" (Japanese: 先輩とワールド・イズ・ノット・イナフ)	October 6, 2013
26	"Stand By Me with Senpai"; Transliteration: "Senpai to Sutando Bai Mī" (Japanese: 先輩とスタンド・バイ・ミー)	October 13, 2013
27	"Mad Max with Senpai"; Transliteration: "Senpai to Maddo Makkusu" (Japanese: 先輩とマッドマックス)	October 20, 2013
28	"Edward Scissorhands with Senpai"; Transliteration: "Senpai to Shizāhanzu" (Japanese: 先輩とシザーハンズ)	October 27, 2013
29	"The Hangover with Senpai"; Transliteration: "Senpai to Hanguōbā" (Japanese: 先輩とハングオーバー)	November 3, 2013
30	"8 Mile with Senpai"; Transliteration: "Senpai to 8 Mairu" (Japanese: 先輩と8マイル)	November 10, 2013
31	"The Merchant of Venice with Senpai"; Transliteration: "Senpai to Venisu no Shōnin" (Japanese: 先輩とヴェニスの商人)	November 17, 2013
32	"Rashomon with Senpai"; Transliteration: "Senpai to Rashōmon" (Japanese: 先輩と羅生門)	November 24, 2013
33	"Constantine with Senpai"; Transliteration: "Senpai to Konsutantin" (Japanese: 先輩とコンスタンティン)	December 1, 2013
34	"Dreamcatcher with Senpai"; Transliteration: "Senpai to Dorīmukyatchā" (Japanese: 先輩とドリームキャッチャー)	December 8, 2013
35	"Tomorrow Never Dies with Senpai"; Transliteration: "Senpai to Tumorō nebā dai" (Japanese: 先輩とトゥモロー・ネバー・ダイ)	December 15, 2013
36	"Coach Carter with Senpai"; Transliteration: "Senpai to Kōchi Kātā" (Japanese: 先輩とトコーチ・カーター)	December 22, 2013
OVA–1	"Tomarin Confidential with Senpai Part One"; Transliteration: "Senpai to Tomarin Konfidensharu Zenpen" (Japanese: 先輩とトマリン・コンフィデンシャル前編)	January 24, 2014
OVA–2	"Tomarin Confidential with Senpai Part Two"; Transliteration: "Senpai to Tomarin Konfidensharu Kōhen" (Japanese: 先輩とトマリン・コンフィデンシャル後編)	January 24, 2014

== Best Selection ==
From July to September 2014, the show was re-edited and rebroadcast on Tokyo MX and KBS Kyoto. The Best Selection episodes were 5 minutes long, and consisted of two Teekyu episodes placed back to back. The Best Selection rebroadcast was 14 episodes, and rebroadcast a selection of episodes from the first three seasons of Teekyu.

== Season 4 ==
No.	Title	Original release date
37	"Men in Black with Senpai"; Transliteration: "Senpai to Men in Burakku" (Japanese: 先輩とメン・イン・ブラック)	April 6, 2015
38	"Romeo Must Die with Senpai"; Transliteration: "Senpai to Romio Masuto Dai" (Japanese: 先輩とロミオ・マスト・ダイ)	April 13, 2015
39	"Trainspotting with Senpai"; Transliteration: "Senpai to Toreinsupottingu" (Japanese: 先輩とトレインスポッティング)	April 20, 2015
40	"Rambo with Senpai"; Transliteration: "Senpai to Ranbō" (Japanese: 先輩とランボー)	April 27, 2015
41	"Jaws with Senpai"; Transliteration: "Senpai to Jōzu" (Japanese: 先輩とジョーズ)	May 4, 2015
42	"Cast Away with Senpai"; Transliteration: "Senpai to Kyasuto Awei" (Japanese: 先輩とキャスト・アウェイ)	May 11, 2015
43	"Enemy at the Gates with Senpai"; Transliteration: "Senpai to Sutāringu Rādo" (Japanese: 先輩とスターリングラード)	May 18, 2015
44	"The Mummy with Senpai"; Transliteration: "Senpai to Hamunaputora" (Japanese: 先輩とハムナプトラ)	May 25, 2015
45	"GOAL! with Senpai"; Transliteration: "Senpai to GOAL!" (Japanese: 先輩とGOAL!)	June 1, 2015
46	"Shaun of the Dead with Senpai"; Transliteration: "Senpai to Shōn obu za Deddo" (Japanese: 先輩とショーン・オブ・ザ・デッド)	June 8, 2015
47	"A Bug's Life with Senpai"; Transliteration: "Senpai to Baguzu Raifu" (Japanese: 先輩とバグズ・ライフ)	June 15, 2015
48	"Apocalypto with Senpai"; Transliteration: "Senpai to Apokariputo" (Japanese: 先輩とアポカリプト)	June 22, 2015
OVA–1	"Back to the Future with Senpai"; Transliteration: "Senpai to Bakku tū za Fyūchā" (Japanese: 先輩とバック・トゥ・ザ・フューチャー)	August 28, 2015
OVA–2	"Mystic River with Senpai"; Transliteration: "Senpai to Misutikku Ribā" (Japanese: 先輩とミスティック・リバー)	August 28, 2015

== Takamiya Nasuno Desu! ==
The Teekyu spinoff aired on the same days as the fourth season of Teekyu. Subtitle is taken from Haruki Murakami work.

No.	Title	Original release date
1	"The Butler"; Transliteration: "Shitsuji Otoko" (Japanese: 執事男)	April 6, 2015
2	"Butler Adventure"; Transliteration: "Shitsuji o Meguru Bōken" (Japanese: 執事を巡る冒険)	April 13, 2015
3	"A Boy Called Butler"; Transliteration: "Shitsuji to Yobare ta Shōnen" (Japanese: 執事と呼ばれた少年)	April 20, 2015
4	"Professor Butler Eats and Speaks"; Transliteration: "Shitsuji Hakase ōini Tabe, ōini Kataru" (Japanese: 執事博士おおいに食べ、おおいに語る)	April 27, 2015
5	"Butler Attack"; Transliteration: "Shitsuji Shūgeki" (Japanese: 執事襲撃)	May 4, 2015
6	"The Second Butler Attack"; Transliteration: "Shitsuji Sai Shūgeki" (Japanese: 執事再襲撃)	May 11, 2015
7	"The End of Butler and Takamiyand"; Transliteration: "Shitsuji no Owari to Takamīyando" (Japanese: 執事の終わりとタカミーヤンド)	May 18, 2015
8	"Piña Colada"; Transliteration: "Pinya Korāda" (Japanese: ピニャ・コラーダ)	May 25, 2015
9	"Banana Daiquiri"; Transliteration: "Banana Daikiri" (Japanese: バナナ・ダイキリ)	June 1, 2015
10	"Rise and Fall of Dorayaki"; Transliteration: "Dorayaki no Seisui" (Japanese: どら焼きの盛衰)	June 8, 2015
11	"A 25 Meter Pool's Worth"; Transliteration: "25 Mētoru Pūru Ichi Hai Bun" (Japanese: 25メートルプール一杯分)	June 15, 2015
12	"Merry-Go-Round"; Transliteration: "Kaiten Mokuba" (Japanese: 回転木馬)	June 22, 2015
OVA	"I am Tasuku Furubira!"; Transliteration: "Furubira Tasuku Desu!" (Japanese: 古平たすくです！)	August 28, 2015

== Season 5 ==
No.	Title	Original release date
49	"The Terminal with Senpai"; Transliteration: "Senpai to Tāminaru" (Japanese: 先輩とターミナル)	July 6, 2015
50	"The Killing Fields with Senpai"; Transliteration: "Senpai to Kiringu Fīrudo" (Japanese: 先輩とキリング・フィールド)	July 13, 2015
51	"Beautiful Dreamer with Senpai"; Transliteration: "Senpai to Byūtifuru Dorīmā" (Japanese: 先輩とビューティフル・ドリーマー)	July 20, 2015
52	"The Cat Returns with Senpai"; Transliteration: "Senpai to Neko no Ongaeshi" (Japanese: 先輩と猫の恩返し)	July 27, 2015
53	"Die Hard: With a Vengeance with Senpai"; Transliteration: "Senpai to Daihādo 3" (Japanese: 先輩とダイ・ハード3)	August 3, 2015
54	"Alien vs. Predator with Senpai"; Transliteration: "Senpai to Eirian VS Puredetā" (Japanese: 先輩とエイリアンVSプレデター)	August 10, 2015
55	"Reservoir Dogs with Senpai"; Transliteration: "Senpai to Rezaboa Doggusu" (Japanese: 先輩とレザボア・ドッグス)	August 17, 2015
56	"Mission: Impossible with Senpai"; Transliteration: "Senpai to Misshon: Inposshiburu" (Japanese: 先輩とミッション：インポッシブル)	August 24, 2015
57	"The Philosopher's Stone with Senpai" ("Senpai and the Philosopher's Stone"); Transliteration: "Senpai to Kenja no Ishi" (Japanese: 先輩と賢者の石)	August 31, 2015
58	"The Day After Tomorrow with Senpai"; Transliteration: "Senpai to Dei Afutā Tumorō" (Japanese: 先輩とデイ・アフター・トゥモロー)	September 7, 2015
59	"The Social Network with Senpai"; Transliteration: "Senpai to Sōsyaru Nettowāku" (Japanese: 先輩とソーシャル・ネットワーク)	September 14, 2015
60	"John Q. with Senpai"; Transliteration: "Senpai to Jyon Kyū" (Japanese: 先輩とジョンQ)	September 21, 2015
OVA–1	"Jumanji with Senpai"; Transliteration: "Senpai to Jumanji" (Japanese: 先輩とジュマンジ)	November 27, 2015
OVA–2	"Jingle All the Way with Senpai"; Transliteration: "Senpai to Jinguru Ōru za Wei" (Japanese: 先輩とジングル・オール・ザ・ウェイ)	November 27, 2015

== Season 6 ==
No.	Title	Original release date
61	"Backdraft with Senpai"; Transliteration: "Senpai to Bakkudorafuto" (Japanese: 先輩とバックドラフト)	October 5, 2015
62	"GoldenEye with Senpai"; Transliteration: "Senpai to Gōruden Ai" (Japanese: 先輩とゴールデンアイ)	October 12, 2015
63	"Love and Honor with Senpai"; Transliteration: "Senpai to Bushi no Ichibun" (Japanese: 先輩と武士の一分)	October 19, 2015
64	"Premium Rush with Senpai"; Transliteration: "Senpai to Puremiamu Rasshu" (Japanese: 先輩とプレミアム・ラッシュ)	October 26, 2015
65	"Tremors with Senpai"; Transliteration: "Senpai to Toremāzu" (Japanese: 先輩とトレマーズ)	November 2, 2015
66	"Bowling for Columbine with Senpai"; Transliteration: "Senpai to Bōringu fō Koronbain" (Japanese: 先輩とボウリング・フォー・コロンバイン)	November 9, 2015
67	"The Dark Knight with Senpai"; Transliteration: "Senpai to Dāku Naito" (Japanese: 先輩とダークナイト)	November 16, 2015
68	"Enchanted with Senpai"; Transliteration: "Senpai to Mahō ni Kakerarete" (Japanese: 先輩と魔法にかけられて)	November 23, 2015
69	"Meet the Parents with Senpai"; Transliteration: "Senpai to Mīto za Pearentsu" (Japanese: 先輩とミート・ザ・ペアレンツ)	November 30, 2015
70	"Wimbledon with Senpai"; Transliteration: "Senpai to Winburudon" (Japanese: 先輩とウィンブルドン)	December 7, 2015
71	"Planet of the Apes with Senpai"; Transliteration: "Senpai to Saru no Wakusei" (Japanese: 先輩と猿の惑星)	December 14, 2015
72	"2001: A Space Odyssey with Senpai"; Transliteration: "Senpai to Nisen-ichi-nen Uchū no Tabi" (Japanese: 先輩と2001年宇宙の旅)	December 21, 2015
OVA–1	"Pacific Rim with Senpai"; Transliteration: "Senpai to Pashifikku Rimu" (Japanese: 先輩とパシフィック・リム)	February 6, 2016
OVA–2	"Usakame High School Tennis Club"; Transliteration: "Usakame Kōkō Teikyu-Bu" (Japanese: 兎亀高校庭球部)	February 6, 2016

== Season 7 ==
No.	Title	Original release date
73	"Ju-On with Senpai"; Transliteration: "Senpai to Juon" (Japanese: 先輩と呪怨)	January 12, 2016
74	"Ironclad with Senpai"; Transliteration: "Senpai to Aiankuraddo" (Japanese: 先輩とアイアンクラッド)	January 19, 2016
75	"Brokeback Mountain with Senpai"; Transliteration: "Senpai to Burōkubakku Maunten" (Japanese: 先輩とブロークバック・マウンテン)	January 26, 2016
76	"Miss Congeniality with Senpai"; Transliteration: "Senpai to Denjarasu Byūtī" (Japanese: 先輩とデンジャラス・ビューティー)	February 2, 2016
77	"Ted with Senpai"; Transliteration: "Senpai to Teddo" (Japanese: 先輩とテッド)	February 9, 2016
78	"Fury with Senpai"; Transliteration: "Senpai to Fyūrī" (Japanese: 先輩とフューリー)	February 16, 2016
79	"The Grand Budapest Hotel with Senpai"; Transliteration: "Senpai to Grando Budapesuto Hoteru" (Japanese: 先輩とグランド・ブダペスト・ホテル)	February 23, 2016
80	"Nurse Betty with Senpai"; Transliteration: "Senpai to Beti Saizumoa" (Japanese: 先輩とベティ・サイズモア)	March 1, 2016
81	"The Exorcist with Senpai"; Transliteration: "Senpai to Ekusoshisuto" (Japanese: 先輩とエクソシスト)	March 8, 2016
82	"The Kirishima Thing with Senpai"; Transliteration: "Senpai to Kirishima, Bukatsu Yamerutteyo" (Japanese: 先輩と桐島、部活やめるってよ)	March 15, 2016
83	"The Straight Story with Senpai"; Transliteration: "Senpai to Sutoreito Sutorī" (Japanese: 先輩とストレイト・ストーリー)	March 22, 2016
84	"Saving Private Ryan with Senpai"; Transliteration: "Senpai to Puraibēto Raian" (Japanese: 先輩とプライベート・ライアン)	March 29, 2016
OVA–1	"Child's Play with Senpai"; Transliteration: "Senpai to Chairudo Purei" (Japanese: 先輩とチャイルド・プレイ)	May 27, 2016
OVA–2	"Northmen: A Viking Saga with Senpai"; Transliteration: "Senpai to Nōsu Wōriāz" (Japanese: 先輩とノース・ウォーリアーズ)	May 27, 2016

== Usakame ==
The Teekyu spinoff. Subtitle is taken from haiku.

No.	Title	Original release date
1	"How Does Someone Ask For Water That is From the Neighbor With Kouhai"; Transliteration: "Kōhai to Tonari wa Nani o Morai Mizu" (Japanese: 後輩と 隣は何を もらい水)	April 11, 2016
2	"Get Out of the Way, Horse Coming Through, With Kouhai, Get Out of the Way"; Transliteration: "Kōhai to Soko Noke Soko Noke Ouma ga Tōru" (Japanese: 後輩と そこのけそこのけ お馬が通る)	April 18, 2016
3	"Spindly, Long and Thin, Just as the Silhouette of a Cat, With Kouhai"; Transliteration: "Kōhai to Hyorori to Neko no Kagebōshi" (Japanese: 後輩と ひょろりと猫の 影法師)	April 25, 2016
4	"The Faint Sound of the Dripping Dew from the Lotus Blossoms With Kouhai"; Transliteration: "Kōhai to Fuyo shitataru Oto su nari" (Japanese: 後輩と 芙蓉したたる 音すなり)	May 2, 2016
5	"The Spring Breeze Blows Through the Feathers On White-Feathered Arrows with Kouhai"; Transliteration: "Kōhai to Harukaze Natte Shiraha no Ya" (Japanese: 後輩と 春風鳴って 白羽の矢)	May 9, 2016
6	"Oh, How I Spent the Long Spring Days Together in the Fields with Kouhai"; Transliteration: "Kōhai to Nobe ni Tsuretatsu Hinaga kana" (Japanese: 後輩と 野辺につれ立つ 日永哉)	May 16, 2016
7	"An Afternoon Moon, Appearing Up in the Sky One Day, with Kouhai"; Transliteration: "Kōhai to Itsuka Dete Aru Hiru no Tsuki" (Japanese: 後輩と いつか出てある 昼の月)	May 23, 2016
8	"The Viscous Water and Gently Blowing Springtime Zephyrs with Kouhai"; Transliteration: "Kōhai to Mizu ga Torori to Haru no Kaze" (Japanese: 後輩と 水がとろりと 春の風)	May 30, 2016
9	"Constitutionals Alongside the Shopkeeper as Well as Kouhai"; Transliteration: "Kōhai to Oku Akindo to Tsuretachi te" (Japanese: 後輩と 奥商人と つれたちて)	June 6, 2016
10	"Could This Truly Be the Dawning of a Springtime Tempest with Kouhai"; Transliteration: "Kōhai to Akeyuku Haru no Arashi kana" (Japanese: 後輩と 明けゆく春の 嵐かな)	June 13, 2016
11	"Oh, to Hear My Name Spoken as the First Rain Starts to Fall with Kouhai"; Transliteration: "Kōhai to Wa ga Na Yobaren Hatsu Shigure" (Japanese: 後輩と 我名よばれん 初しぐれ)	June 20, 2016
12	"To Gaze Upon an Aureolin Butterfly Alongside Kouhai"; Transliteration: "Kōhai to Kinaru Tefutefu Hitotsu Mishi" (Japanese: 後輩と 黄なるてふてふ 一つ見し)	June 27, 2016
OVA	"Yawn and Go away with Kouhai"; Transliteration: "Kōhai to Akubi Utsushite Wakareyuku" (Japanese: 後輩と あくびうつして 分れ行く)	August 28, 2016

== Season 8 ==
No.	Title	Original release date
85	"Lord of the Flies with Senpai"; Transliteration: "Senpai to Hae no Ō" (Japanese: 先輩と蝿の王)	October 5, 2016
86	"Se7en with Senpai"; Transliteration: "Senpai to Sebun" (Japanese: 先輩とセブン)	October 12, 2016
87	"28 Days Later with Senpai"; Transliteration: "Senpai to Nijūhachi Nichi Go" (Japanese: 先輩と28日後)	October 19, 2016
88	"Titanic with Senpai"; Transliteration: "Senpai to Taitanikku" (Japanese: 先輩とタイタニック)	October 26, 2016
89	"The Super-Scary Super-Strange Files! Scariest Movie Ever with Senpai"; Transliteration: "Senpai to Senritsu Kaiki Fairu Kowasugi! Shijō Saikyō no Gakijōban" (Japanese: 先輩と戦慄怪奇ファイル コワすぎ! 史上最恐の劇場版)	November 2, 2016
90	"Night at the Museum with Senpai"; Transliteration: "Senpai to Naito Myūjiamu" (Japanese: 先輩とナイトミュージアム)	November 9, 2016
91	"Oblivion with Senpai"; Transliteration: "Senpai to Oburibion" (Japanese: 先輩とオブリビオン)	November 16, 2016
92	"Face/Off with Senpai"; Transliteration: "Senpai to Feisu/Ofu" (Japanese: 先輩とフェイス/オフ)	November 23, 2016
93	"Once Upon a Time in America with Senpai"; Transliteration: "Senpai to Wansu apon a Taimu in Amerika" (Japanese: 先輩とワンス・アポン・ア・タイム・イン・アメリカ)	November 30, 2016
94	"Once Upon a Time in China with Senpai"; Transliteration: "Senpai to Wansu apon a Taimu in Chaina" (Japanese: 先輩とワンス・アポン・ア・タイム・イン・チャイナ)	December 7, 2016
95	"Enemy of the State with Senpai"; Transliteration: "Senpai to Enemī obu Amerika" (Japanese: 先輩とエネミー・オブ・アメリカ)	December 14, 2016
96	"Saturday Night Fever with Senpai"; Transliteration: "Senpai to Satadē Naito Fībā" (Japanese: 先輩とサタデー・ナイト・フィーバー)	December 21, 2016
OVA–1	"Star Wars with Senpai"; Transliteration: "Senpai to Sutā Wōzu" (Japanese: 先輩とスター・ウォーズ)	March 17, 2017
OVA–2	"Straight Outta Compton with Senpai"; Transliteration: "Senpai to Sutoreito Auta Komputon" (Japanese: 先輩とストレイト・アウタ・コンプトン)	March 17, 2017

== Season 9 ==
No.	Title	Original release date
97	"Species with Senpai"; Transliteration: "Senpai to Supīsīzu" (Japanese: 先輩とスピーシーズ)	July 12, 2017
98	"Home Alone with Senpai"; Transliteration: "Senpai to Hōmu Arōn" (Japanese: 先輩とホーム・アローン)	July 19, 2017
99	"Pitch Perfect with Senpai"; Transliteration: "Senpai to Picchi Pāfekuto" (Japanese: 先輩とピッチ・パーフェクト)	July 26, 2017
100	"300 with Senpai"; Transliteration: "Senpai to 300" (Japanese: 先輩と300)	August 2, 2017
101	"101 Dalmatians with Senpai"; Transliteration: "Senpai to 101" (Japanese: 先輩と101)	August 9, 2017
102	"Nasu: Summer in Andalusia with Senpai"; Transliteration: "Senpai to Nasu Andarushia no Natsu" (Japanese: 先輩と茄子 アンダルシアの夏)	August 16, 2017
103	"Sadako vs. Kayako with Senpai"; Transliteration: "Senpai to Sadako vs Kayako" (Japanese: 先輩と貞子vs伽椰子)	August 23, 2017
104	"Chef with Senpai"; Transliteration: "Senpai to Shefu Mitsuboshi Fūdo Torakku Hajimemashita" (Japanese: 先輩とシェフ 三ツ星フードトラック始めました)	August 30, 2017
105	"Deadpool with Senpai"; Transliteration: "Senpai to Deddopūru" (Japanese: 先輩とデッドプール)	September 6, 2017
106	"Battles Without Honor and Humanity with Senpai"; Transliteration: "Senpai to Jingi naki Tatakai" (Japanese: 先輩と仁義なき戦い)	September 13, 2017
107	"Dr. Dolittle with Senpai"; Transliteration: "Senpai to Dokutā Doritoru" (Japanese: 先輩とドクター・ドリトル)	September 20, 2017
108	"The Sound of Music With Senpai"; Transliteration: "Senpai to Saundo obu Myūjikku" (Japanese: 先輩とサウンド・オブ・ミュージック)	September 27, 2017
