= Birdsong (disambiguation) =

Birdsong, along with bird calls, are sounds made by birds.

Birdsong or Bird Song may also refer to:

== Arts and entertainment ==
=== Film, television and literature ===
- Birdsong (novel), by Sebastian Faulks, 1993
  - Birdsong (radio drama), 1997, based on the novel
  - Birdsong (play), 2010, based on the novel
  - Birdsong (serial), a 2012 TV adaptation of the novel
- Birdsong (film), a 2008 Catalan film
- Birdsong (radio channel), a temporary channel on British digital radio
- Birdsong (short story), a 2010 short story by Chimamanda Ngozi Adichie

=== Music ===
- The Birdsongs (band), an American Christian rock band

==== Albums ====
- Bird Song (Mannheim Steamroller album), 2001
- Bird Song (Hampton Hawes album), recorded 1956–58, released 1999
- Bird Songs (Joe Lovano album), 2011
- Bird Songs (Sphere album), 1988
- Bird Songs: The Final Recordings, by Dizzy Gillespie, 1997
- Bird Song: Live 1971, by The Holy Modal Rounders, 2004

==== Songs ====
- "Birdsong", a composition by Graham Ashton
- "Bird Songs", a 1907 song by Liza Lehmann
- "Bird Song" (Lene Lovich song), 1979
- "Bird Song" (M.I.A. song), 2016
- "Bird Song", a song by Jerry Garcia, from the 1972 album Garcia
- "Bird Song", a song by Florence and the Machine from the 2009 album Lungs: The B-Sides

== Businesses ==
- Birdsong (restaurant), a Michelin-starred restaurant in San Francisco, California

== People ==
- Birdsong (surname), including a list of people with the surname

== Places ==
- Birdsong, Alabama, U.S.
- Birdsong, Arkansas, U.S.
- Birdsong Sandstone, a geologic formation in Australia

== See also ==
- Song of the Birds (disambiguation)
