= Song of the Birds =

Song of the Birds or The Song of the Birds may refer to:

== Film ==
- The Song of the Birds, a 1935 cartoon
  - Song of the Birds (1949 film), a Noveltoons remake with Little Audrey

== Literature ==
- Song of the Birds (book), a 1985 collection of sayings, stories, and impressions of Pablo Casals by Julian Lloyd Webber
- The Song of the Birds; or Analogies of Animal and Spiritual Life, an 1845 book by William Evans
- Il Canto degl'Augelli (Italian, 'The song of the birds'), a 1601 book by Antonio Valli da Todi
- Shirat ha-Tziporim (Hebrew, 'The Song of the Birds'), a 1985 work of poetry by Maya Bejerano

== Music ==
- "El cant dels ocells" (Catalan, 'Song of the Birds'), a traditional Christmas song and lullaby
- Cant dels Ocells (Catalan, 'Song of the Birds'), instrumental arrangement by Pablo Casals of the traditional song (composition for cello and organ)
- The Song of the Birds, a 1951 cello concerto by Herbert Murrill
- Song of the Birds, a piano composition by Carl Heins
- Song of the Birds, a composition by Gregory Short
- Le chant des oiseaux (French, 'The Song of the Birds'), a c. 1528 composition by Clément Janequin
- Tori no Uta (Japanese: 鳥の歌, 'Song of the Birds'), a 2009 CD by Cocco

== See also ==
- Birdsong (disambiguation)
