= All the Time =

All the Time may refer to:

- All the Time (Jessy Lanza album), 2020
- All the Time (The Temptations album), 2018
- "All the Time" (Kitty Wells song), 1959
- "All the Time" (The Strokes song), 2012
- "All the Time" (Playmen song), 2012
- "All the Time" (Zara Larsson song), 2019
- "All the Time", a song from the 1958 musical Oh, Captain!
- "All the Time", a song by Barry Manilow from his 1976 album This One's for You
- "All the Time", a song by Jeremy Camp from his 2002 album Stay
- "All the Time", a song by Candy Coded from their 2015 extended play Moonlight
- "All the Time", a song by Destroy Lonely from his 2023 album If Looks Could Kill
- "All the Time", a song by Green Day from their 1997 album Nimrod
- "All the Time", a song by David James from his 2020 extended play If I Were You
- "All the Time", a song by Jeremih, 2013
- "All the Time", a song by Kim Petras, 2018
- "All the Time", a song by The Reklaws, 2024
- "All the Time", a song by Femtanyl, 2026
