= The Journey Begins =

The Journey Begins or variation may refer to:

== Film and television ==
- Mortal Kombat: The Journey Begins, a 1995 animated direct-to-video tie-in to the 1995 film Mortal Kombat

=== Television episodes ===
- "The Journey Begins", Changing Lanes episode 1 (2010)
- "The Journey Begins", Come Dance with Me episode 1 (2022)
- "The Journey Begins", Digimon Tamers episode 24 (2001)
- "The Journey Begins", Iron Kid episode 3 (2006)
- "The Journey Begins", Kana Kaanum Kaalangal (2022) season 2, episode 56 (2023)
- "The Journey Begins", Love All Play (Japanese) episode 2 (2022)
- "The Journey Begins", Monster Hunter Stories: Ride On episode 15 (2017)
- "The Journey Begins", Road to Avonlea season 1, episode 1 (1990)
- "The Journey Begins", The Animals of Farthing Wood season 1, episode 1 (1993)
- "The Journey Begins", The Lost World season 1, episode 1 (1999)
- "The Journey Begins", The New Legends of Monkey season 1, episode 3 (2018)
- "The Journey Begins", The Simple Life season 2, episode 1 (2004)
- "The Journey Begins!", The Wrong Way to Use Healing Magic episode 13 (2024)

== Literature ==
- The Dark Tower: The Gunslinger - The Journey Begins, a 2010 comic book limited series based on Stephen King's The Dark Tower; the first installment of the story arc The Gunslinger
- The Journey Begins, the 2015 collected edition of the comic book series Anne Bonnie
- The Journey Begins, a 2010 webcomic and the first story arc in the comic series The Wormworld Saga

== Music ==
- Journey Begins, a 2010 album released by Tiffin Beats Records and the debut album of British singer Mumzy Stranger
- "The Journey Begins", a song from the 2004 Disney film Mulan II

== See also ==
- A journey of a thousand miles begins with a single step (Chinese proverb)
- End of a Journey, Yet Beginning of a Journey (TV episode) 2006 episode of Pokémon: Battle Frontier
- The Journey: Act I; The Beginning (2012 album) debut EP for the band The Birdsongs (band)
- The Beginning of the Journey (1993 book) a memoir of Diana Trilling
- Journey (disambiguation)
- Begin (disambiguation)
