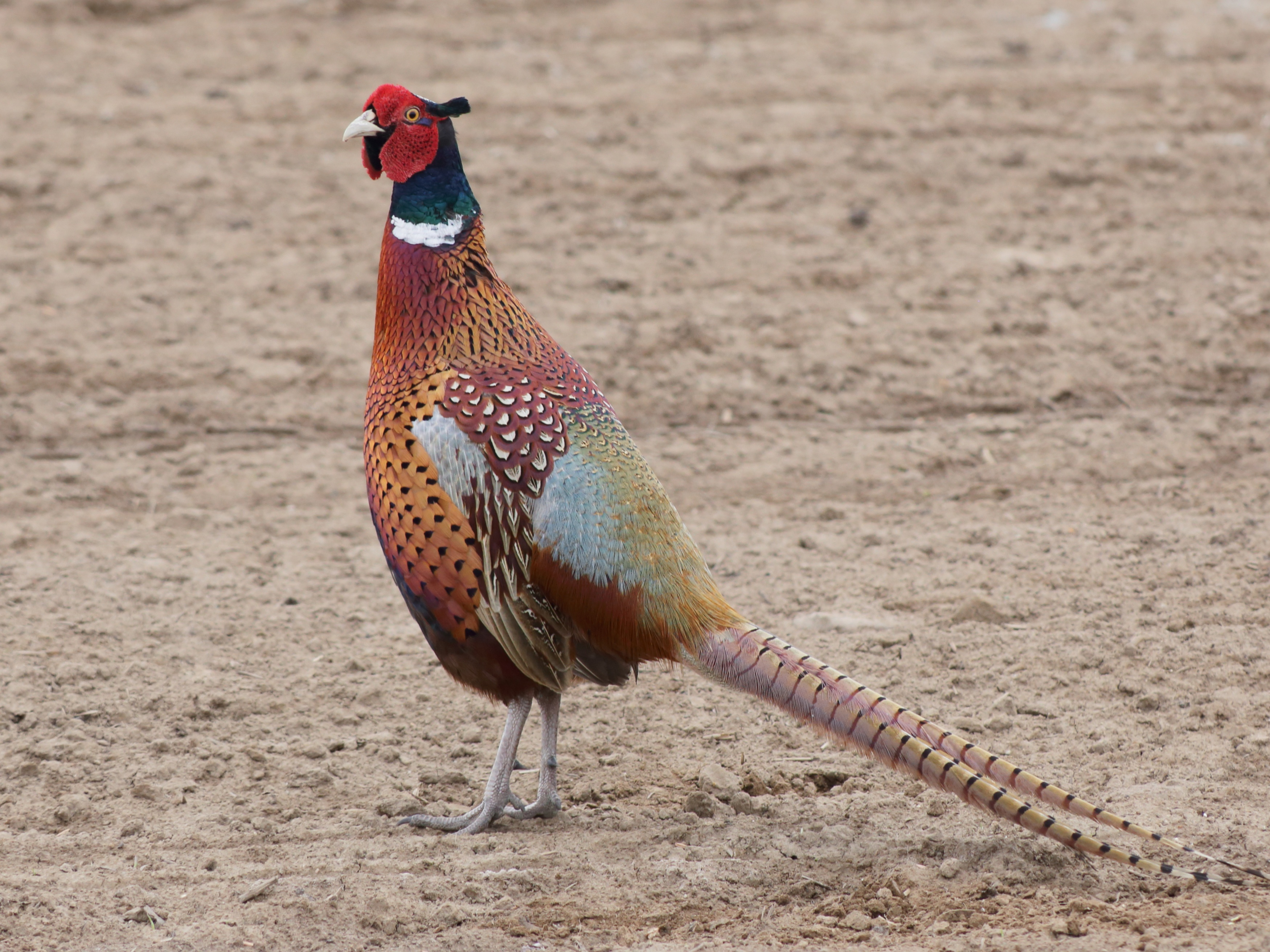
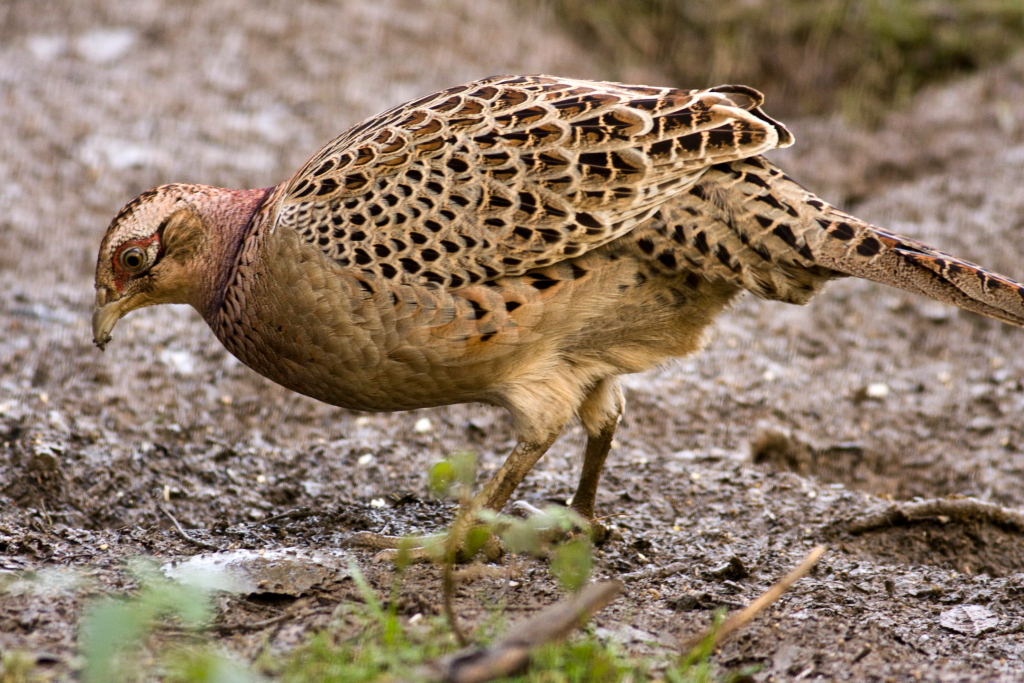
- Male ("cock") from Oulu, Finland Female ("hen") from England
- Call

Conservation status
- Least Concern (IUCN 3.1)

Scientific classification
- Kingdom: Animalia
- Phylum: Chordata
- Class: Aves
- Order: Galliformes
- Family: Phasianidae
- Genus: Phasianus
- Species: P. colchicus

Binomial name
- Phasianus colchicus Linnaeus, 1758
- Geographical distribution of common pheasant Native Introduced

Synonyms
- Phasianus phasis

= Common pheasant =

Common pheasant Temporal range: Pleistocene–present

Species of bird

The common pheasant (Phasianus colchicus), ring-necked pheasant, or blue-headed pheasant, is a bird in the pheasant family (Phasianidae). The genus name comes from Latin phasianus 'pheasant'. The species name colchicus is Latin for 'of Colchis' (modern day Georgia), a country on the Black Sea where pheasants became known to Europeans. Although Phasianus was previously thought to be closely related to the genus Gallus, the genus of junglefowl and domesticated chickens, recent studies show that they are in different subfamilies, having diverged over 20 million years ago.

It is native to Asia, where it is widespread, and also to the extreme southeast of Europe in the northern foothills of the Caucasus Mountains. It has been widely introduced elsewhere as a game bird. In parts of its range, mainly in places where none of its relatives occurs such as in Europe, where it is naturalised, it is simply known as the pheasant. Ring-necked pheasant is both the collective name for a number of subspecies and their intergrades that have white neck rings and the name used for the species as a whole in North America.

It is a well-known gamebird, among those of more than regional importance perhaps the most widespread and ancient one in the whole world. The common pheasant is one of the world's most hunted birds; it has been introduced for that purpose to many regions and is also common on game farms, where it is commercially bred. The ring-necked subspecies group in particular are commonly bred and were introduced to many parts of the world; the game farm stock, though no distinct breeds have been developed yet, can be considered semi-domesticated. The ring-necked pheasant is the state bird of South Dakota, one of only two US state birds that is not a species native to the United States.

The green pheasant (P. versicolor) of Japan is sometimes considered a subspecies of the common pheasant. Though the species produce fertile hybrids wherever they coexist, this is simply a typical feature among fowl (Galloanseres), in which postzygotic isolating mechanisms are slight compared to most other birds. The species apparently have somewhat different ecological requirements and at least in its typical habitat, the green pheasant outcompetes the common pheasant. The introduction of the latter to Japan has therefore largely failed.

== Distribution ==
Common pheasants are native to Asia and parts of Europe, their original range extending from the eastern Black Sea and the Caspian Sea to Manchuria, Siberia, Korea, Mainland China, and Taiwan.

Southern Caucasian pheasants (P. c. colchicus) were common in Greece during the classical period and it is a widespread myth that the Greeks took pheasants to the Balkans when they colonised Colchis in the Caucasus. This colonisation happened during the 6th century BC, but pheasant archaeological remains in the Balkans are much older dating to 6th millennium BC. This fact indicates that probably pheasants reached the area naturally. Additionally it seems that they had a continuous range in Turkey from the Sea of Marmara on the edge of the Balkans, across the northern shore of the country till Caucasus. The last remnants of the Balkan population survive in the Kotza-Orman riparian forest of Nestos, in Greece with an estimated population of 100–200 adult birds. In Bulgaria they were lost in the 1970s because they hybridised with introduced eastern subspecies.

Besides the Balkans the species lives in Europe in the area north of Caucasus where the local subspecies P. c. septentrionalis survives pure around the lower reaches of the Samur River. Reintroduction efforts in the rest of the north Caucasian range may include hybrid birds.

=== Introduced populations ===
Common pheasants can be found across the globe due to their readiness to breed in captivity and the fact that they can naturalise in many climates, but are known to be introduced in Europe (apart from the extreme southeast, where native), North America, Japan and New Zealand. Pheasants were hunted in their natural range by Stone Age humans just like the grouse and partridges that inhabited Europe at that time. The common pheasant was originally introduced to Europe during the Roman period. Recipes for preparing pheasant meat were discussed by Marcus Gavius Apicius in the first century AD; pheasant husbandry is also discussed by Columella in the same century and, based on the former's writings, by Rutilius Taurus Aemilianus Palladius in De Re Rustica in 350 AD.

Common pheasants have also been introduced to Hawaiian Islands, Chile, Uruguay, Peru, Argentina, Brazil, South Africa, New Zealand, and Australia, including the island state of Tasmania and small offshore islands such as Rottnest Island off Western Australia. Introductions in the Southern Hemisphere have mostly failed, except where local Galliformes or their ecological equivalents are rare or absent.

==== British Isles ====
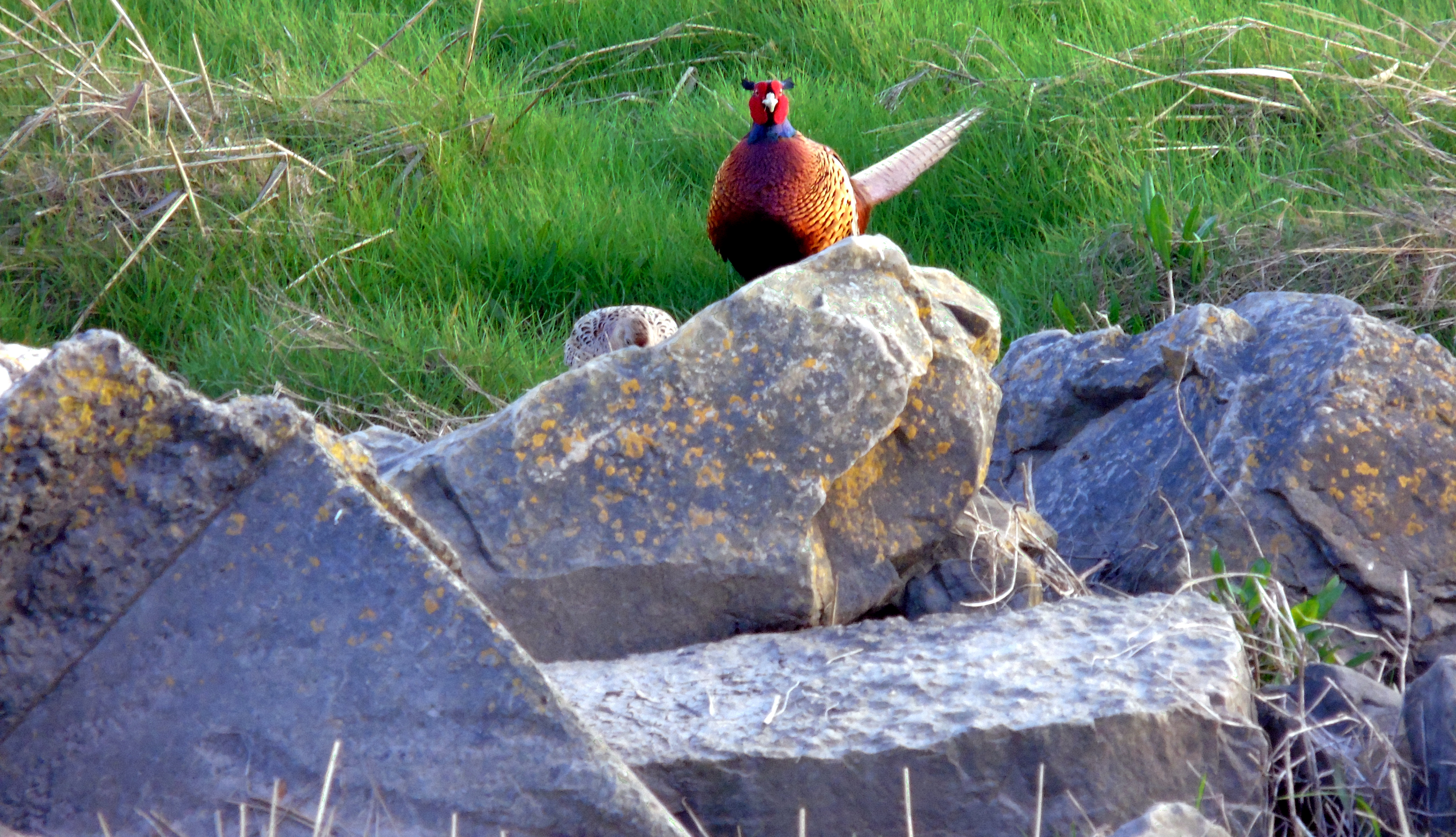
A pair of pheasants at the Newport Wetlands RSPB Reserve

The bird was naturalised in Great Britain around AD 1059, but may have been introduced by the Romano-British centuries earlier. It was the Caucasian subspecies mistakenly known as the 'Old English pheasant' rather than the Chinese ring-necked pheasants (P. c. torquatus) that were then introduced to Britain. However, it became extinct from most of Britain in the early 17th century. There were further re-introductions of 'white neck-ringed' birds in the 18th century. It was rediscovered as a game bird in the 1830s after being ignored for many years in an amalgam of forms. Since then it has been reared extensively by gamekeepers and is shot in season from 1 October to 31 January. Pheasants are moderately adapted to the British climate and breed naturally in small numbers in the wild without human supervision in copses, heaths and commons. Imported stock has originated from a number of other subspecies in addition to P. c. colchicus and P. c. torquatus, including the Prince of Wales pheasant (P. c. principalis), the Mongolian pheasant (P. c. mongolicus), the Satchu pheasant (P. c. satscheuensis), and Pallas's pheasant (P. c. pallasi), alongside the related green pheasant. Extensive interbreeding has occurred between these stocks, so that most British pheasants are of mixed heritage and display an at least partial neck ring, and the "Old English" type is no longer encountered in its original form. Common British phenotypes include a cream-coloured variant termed the "Bohemian" pheasant and a melanistic form derived from partly green pheasant ancestry.

The first mentions of pheasants in Scotland occur in the late sixteenth century, although they did not penetrate as far as the Scottish Highlands until the nineteenth, when a cock was recorded in the Grampian Mountains in 1826. By 1950 pheasants bred throughout the British Isles, although they were scarce in Ireland. Because around 47,000,000 pheasants are released each year on shooting estates, it is widespread in distribution, although most released birds survive less than a year in the wild. The Bohemian was most likely seen in North Norfolk. The Game & Wildlife Conservation Trust is researching the breeding success of reared pheasants and trying to find ways to improve this breeding success to reduce the demand to release as many reared pheasants and increase the wild population. As the original Caucasian stock all but disappeared during the Early Modern era, most 'dark-winged ringless' birds in the UK are actually descended from 'Chinese ring-necked' and 'green pheasant' hybrids, which were commonly used for shooting estate stocking.

==== North America ====
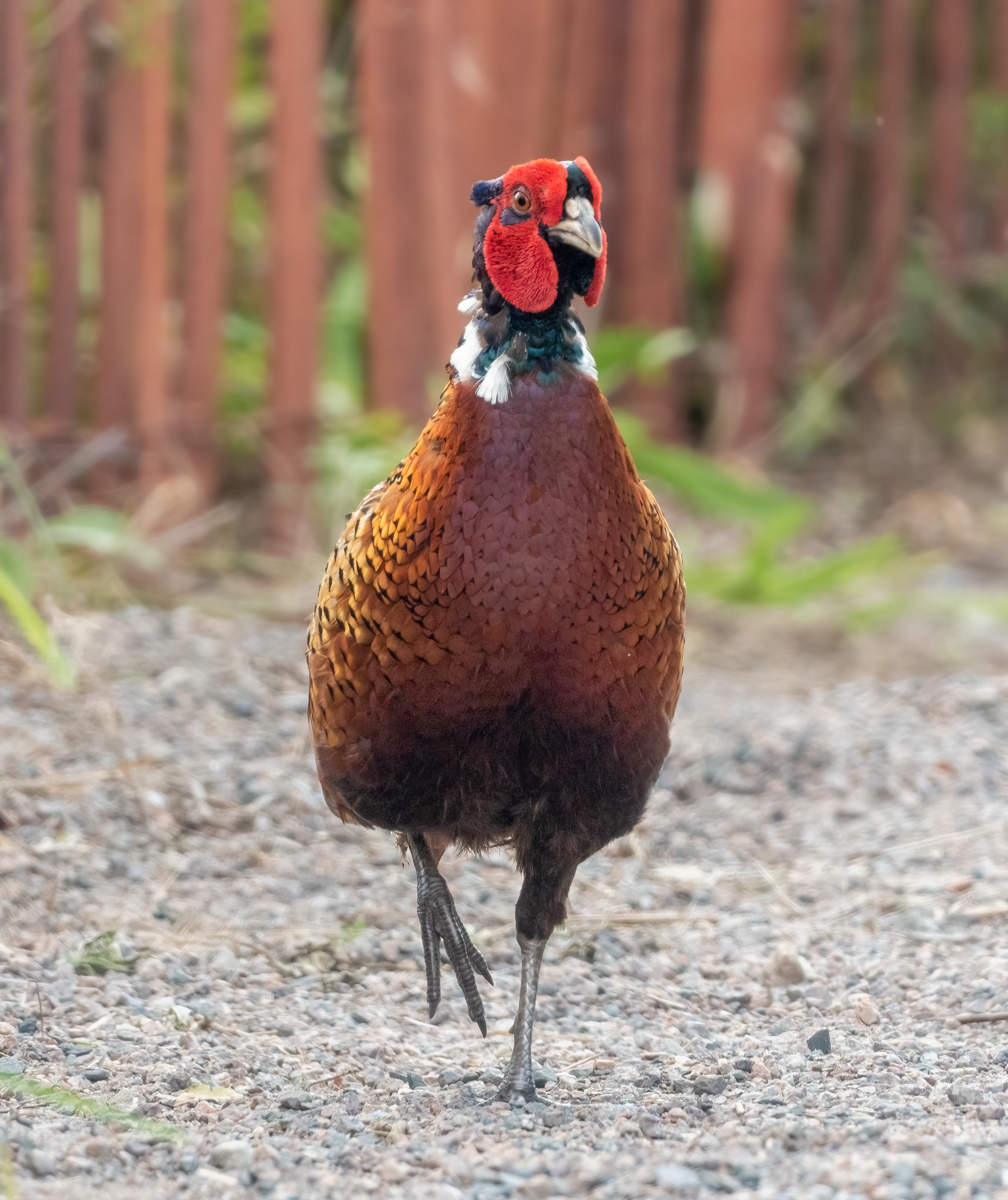
Male; Marine Park

Common pheasants were introduced in North America beginning in 1773, with the first large-scale successful introduction occurring in 1881 in the Williamette Valley of Oregon, followed by Washington in 1883 and California in 1889. Stocking of large pheasant populations in the plains and eastern states occurred in following decades after successful hunting seasons were recorded in the western states. Pheasants have become well established throughout much of the Rocky Mountain states (Colorado, Idaho, Montana, Wyoming, etc.), the Midwest, the Plains states, as well as Canada and Mexico. In the southwest, they can even be seen south of the Rockies in Bosque del Apache National Wildlife Refuge 161 km (100 mi) south of Albuquerque, New Mexico. The largest populations of pheasants in the United States occur in a continuous belt over the Great Plains, the Corn Belt and the Wheat Belt, with extensions of its range reaching into southern Canada and the farmland areas of New England. Smaller populations occur in valleys and irrigated areas through the Intermountain West and the coast states, although these are separated by high mountain areas inhospitable to pheasants. Introductions failed in the more humid Southern states and in the American Southwest.

Most common pheasants bagged in the United States are wild-born feral pheasants. In some states captive-reared and released birds make up much of the population. Pheasant hunting is very popular in much of the US, especially in the Great Plains states, where a mix of farmland and native grasslands provides ideal habitat. South Dakota alone has an annual harvest of over 1 million birds a year by over 200,000 hunters.

== Description ==
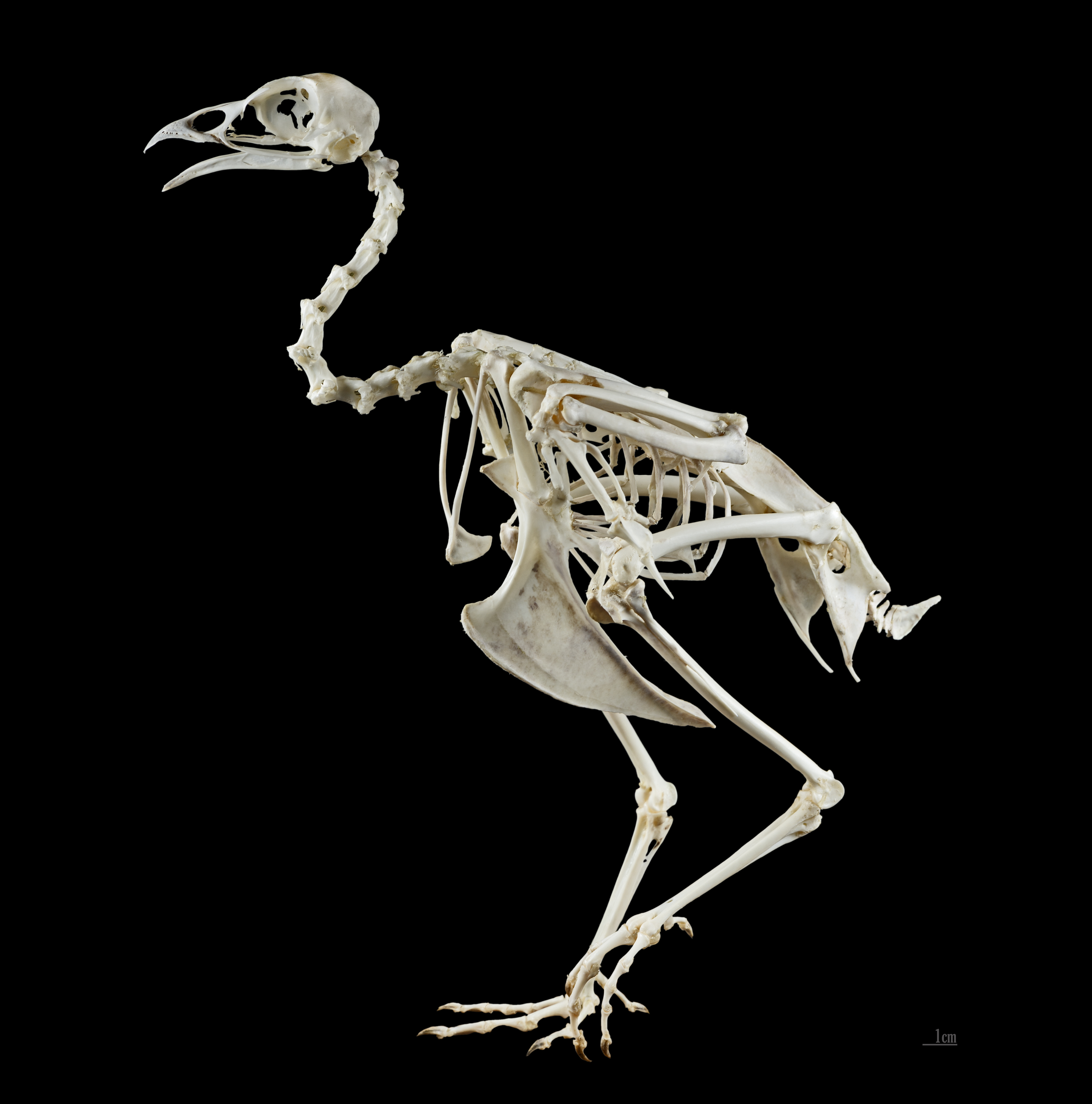
Skeleton; MHNT

There are many colour forms of the male common pheasant, ranging in colour from nearly white to almost black in some melanistic examples. These are due to captive breeding and hybridisation between subspecies and with the green pheasant, reinforced by continual releases of stock from varying sources to the wild. For example, the "ring-necked pheasants" common in Europe, North America and Australia do not pertain to any specific taxon, they rather represent a stereotyped hybrid swarm. Body weight can range from 0.5 to 3 kg (1 to 7 lb), with males averaging 1.2 kg (2 lb 10 oz) and females averaging 0.9 kg (2 lb 0 oz). Wingspan ranges from 56–86 cm (22–34 in).

The adult male common pheasant of the nominate subspecies Phasianus colchicus colchicus is 60–89 cm (23 1/2–35 in) in length with a long brown streaked black tail, accounting for almost 50 cm (20 in) of the total length. The body plumage is barred bright gold or fiery copper-red and chestnut-brown plumage with iridescent sheen of green and purple; but rump uniform is sometimes blue. The wing coverage is white or cream and black-barred markings are common on the tail. The head is bottle green with a small crest and distinctive red wattle. P. c. colchicus and some other races lack a white neck ring. Behind the face are two ear-tufts, that make the pheasant appear more alert.

The female (hen) and juveniles are much less showy, with a duller mottled brown plumage all over and measuring 50–63 cm (19 1/2–25 in) long including a tail of around 20 cm (8 in). Juvenile birds have the appearance of the female with a shorter tail until young males begin to grow characteristic bright feathers on the breast, head and back at about 10 weeks after hatching.

The green pheasant (P. versicolor) is very similar, and hybridisation often makes the identity of individual farmed birds difficult to determine. Green pheasant males on average have a shorter tail than the common pheasant and have darker plumage that is uniformly bottle-green on the breast and belly; they always lack a neck ring. Green pheasant females are darker, with many black dots on the breast and belly.

In addition, various colour mutations are commonly encountered, mainly melanistic (black) and flavistic (isabelline or fawn) specimens. The former are rather commonly released in some areas and are named "tenebrosus pheasant" or simply "melanistic mutant".

== Ecology ==
These birds are found in woodland, farmland, scrub, and wetlands. In their natural habitat, common pheasants live in grassland near water with small copses of trees, and are tolerant of both dry and humid soils. Extensively cleared farmland, however, is marginal habitat that cannot maintain self-sustaining populations for long.

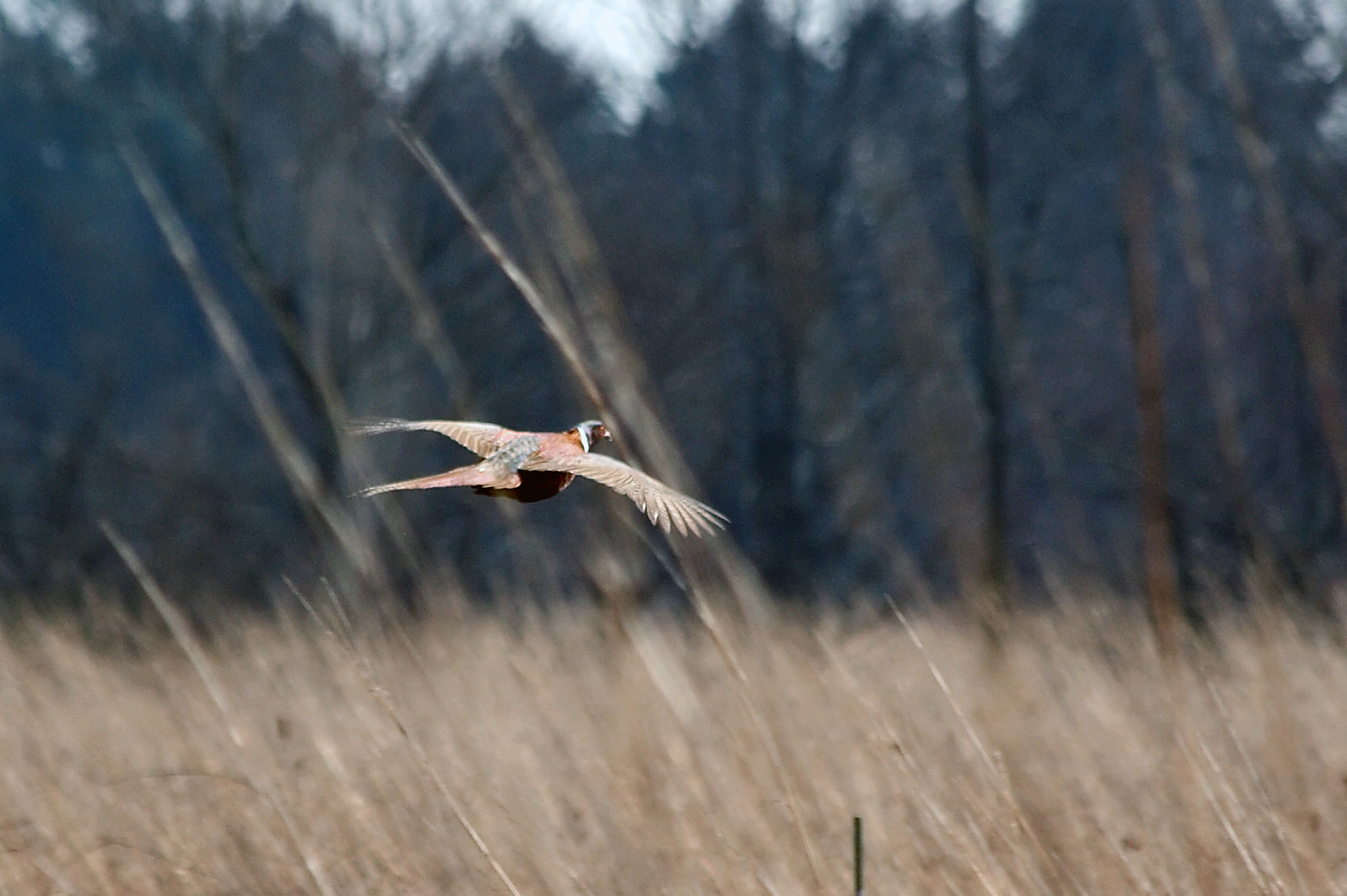
Cock bird takes flight

Common pheasants are gregarious birds and outside the breeding season form loose flocks. However, captive bred common pheasants can show strong sexual segregation, in space and time, with sex differences in the use of feeding stations throughout the day. Wherever they are hunted they are always timid once they associate humans with danger, and will quickly retreat for safety after hearing the arrival of hunting parties in the area.

They eat a wide variety of animal and vegetable type-food. Vegetable forage includes fruit, seeds, grain, mast, berries and leaves, while animal food includes a wide range of invertebrates, such as slugs, earthworms, leatherjackets, ant eggs, wireworms, caterpillars, grasshoppers and other insects. Small vertebrates like lizards, field voles, other small mammals, and small birds are occasionally taken.

While common pheasants are able short-distance fliers, they prefer to run. If startled however, they can suddenly burst upwards at great speed, with a distinctive "whirring" wing sound and often giving kok kok kok calls to alert conspecifics. Their flight speed is only 43–61 km/h (27–38 mph) when cruising but when chased they can fly up to 90 km/h (56 mph).

=== Nesting ===
Common pheasants nest solely on the ground in scrapes, lined with some grass and leaves, frequently under dense cover or a hedge. Occasionally they will nest in a haystack, or old nest left by other bird. They roost in sheltered trees at night. The males are polygynous as is typical for many Phasianidae, and are often accompanied by a harem of several females.

Breeding beings in April. Hens scrape a hollow in the ground lined with grass and dead leaves, in which they lay a clutch of eight to fifteen eggs. These are brown-olive in colour. The hen afterwards incubates them twenty-three to twenty-five days. The chicks stay near the hen for several weeks, yet leave the nest when only a few hours old. After hatching they grow quickly, flying after 12–14 days, resembling adults by only 15 weeks of age.

Nest parasitism, or brood parasitism, is common in pheasants because of their propensity to nest near other birds and the fact that nesting requirements are similar to those of other prairie birds and waterfowl that inhabit the same areas. This phenomenon has been observed in grey partridges; prairie chickens; several types of duck, rail, grouse, turkeys, and others. Effects of nest parasitism may include abandonment of nests with a high proportion of foreign eggs, lower hatching rates, and lower numbers of eggs laid by the host species. Pheasant eggs also have a shorter incubation time than many of their nestmates, which may result in the individual watching over the nest to abandon her own eggs after the pheasants hatch, thinking that the remaining eggs are not viable. Pheasants raised in other species' nests often imprint on their caretaker, which may result in them adopting atypical behaviour for their species. This is sometimes the cause of hybridisation of species as pheasants adopt the mating behaviour of their nest's host species.

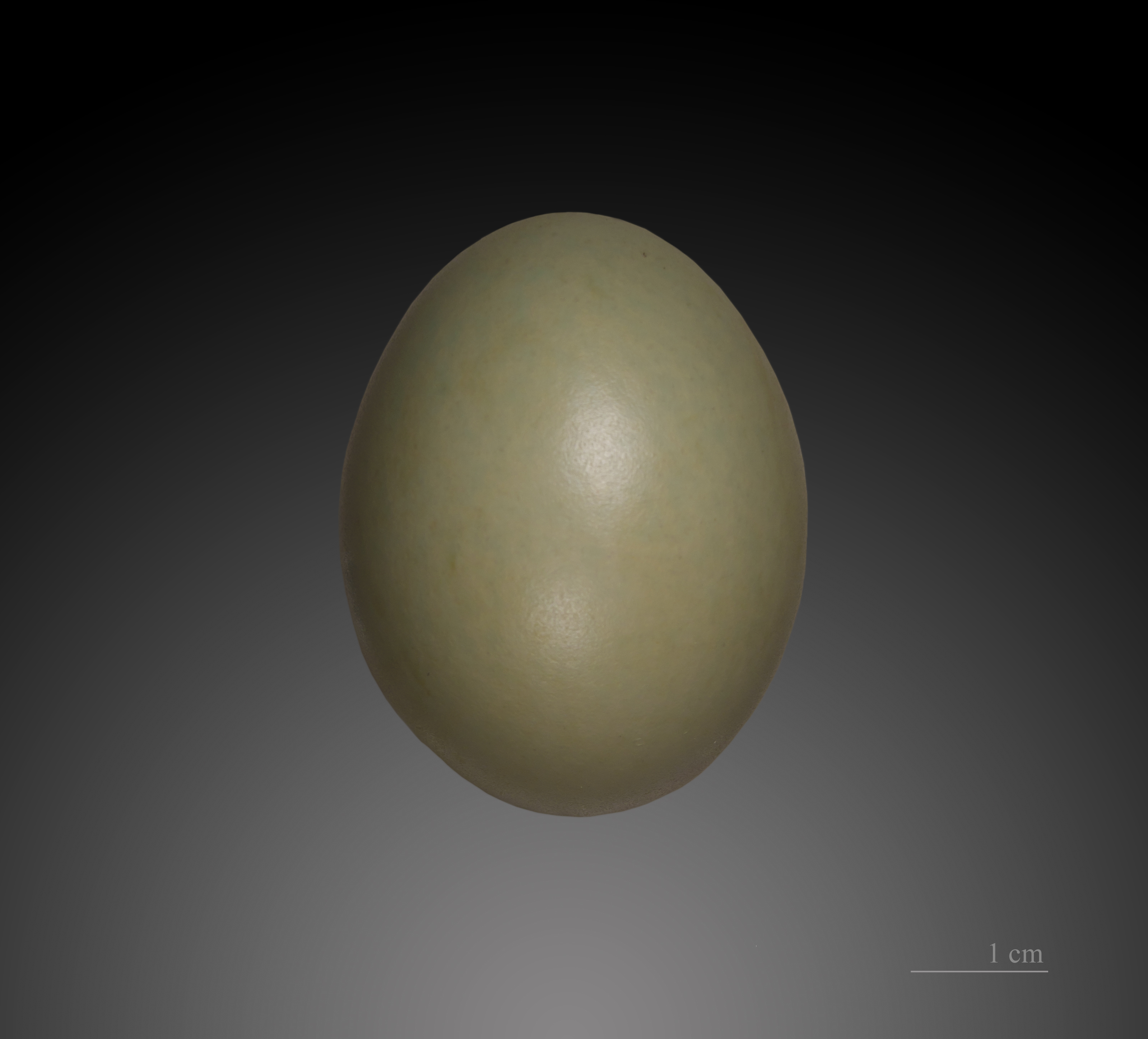
Egg specimen

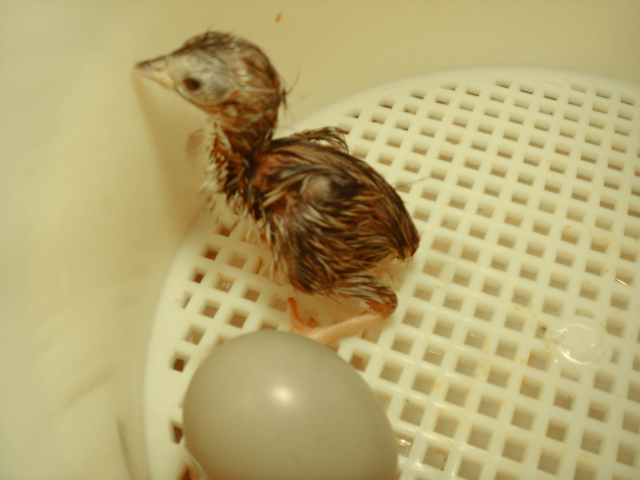
Hatchling in incubator

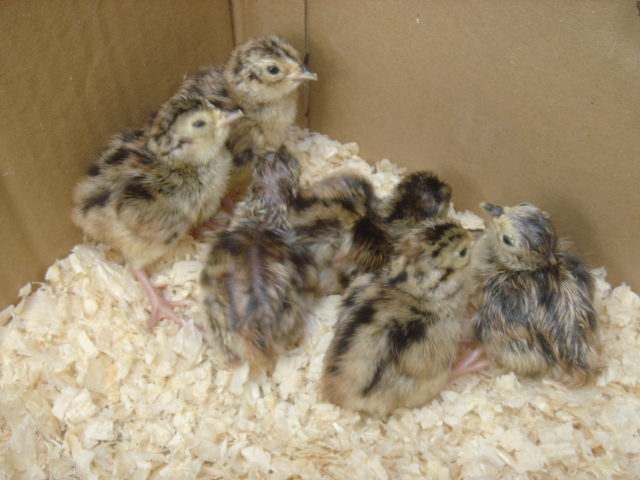
Hour-old chicks

=== Competition ===
There are a number of ways common pheasants affect other game birds. Apart from nest parasitism, disease, aggression, and competition for resources are other negative effects.

Pheasants often compete with other native birds for resources. Studies have shown that they can lead to decreased populations of bobwhites and partridges due to habitat and food competition. Insects are a valuable food source for both pheasants and partridges and competition may lead to decreased populations of partridges. Pheasants may also introduce disease, such as blackhead, to native populations. While pheasants tolerate the infection well, other birds such as ruffed grouse, chukar, and grey partridge are highly susceptible. Pheasants also have a tendency to harass or kill other birds. One study in 1979 noted that in pheasant vs. prairie chicken interactions, the pheasants were victorious 78% of the time.

== Taxonomy and systematics ==
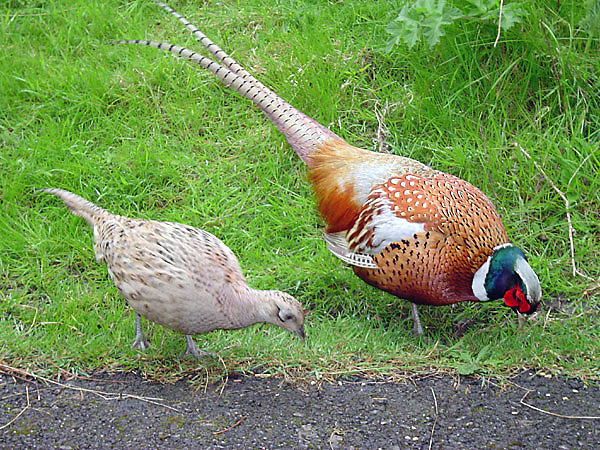
Chinese ringneck-type male (note grey rump) with very pale female, illustrating the dramatic difference in both colour and size between sexes as per sexual dimorphism

This species was first scientifically described by Carl Linnaeus in his landmark 1758 10th edition of Systema Naturae under its modern scientific name. The common pheasant is distinct enough from any other species known to Linnaeus for a laconic [Phasianus] rufus, capîte caeruleo, "a red pheasant with blue head", to serve as entirely sufficient description. The bird had been extensively discussed before Linnaeus established binomial nomenclature so was already well-known. His sources are the Ornithologia of Ulisse Aldrovandi, Giovanni Pietro Olina's Uccelliera, John Ray's Synopsis methodica Avium & Piscium, and A Natural History of the Birds by Eleazar Albin. Therein—essentially the bulk of the ornithology textbooks of his day—the species is simply named "the pheasant" in the books' respective languages. Whereas in most other species, Linnaeus felt it warranted to cite plumage details from his sources, in the common pheasant's case he simply referred to the reason of the bird's fame: principum mensis dicatur.

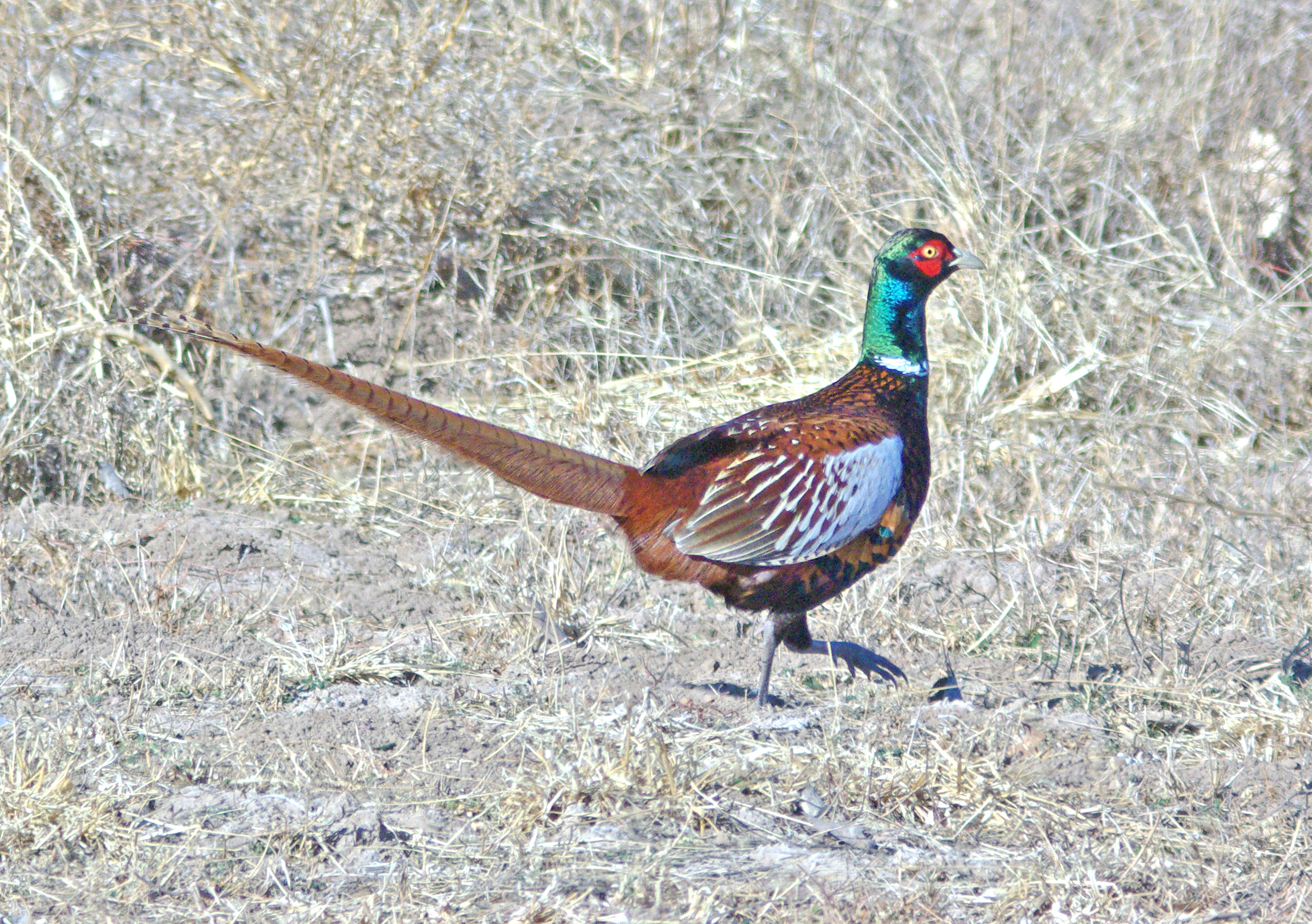
Male, New Mexico

The type locality is given simply as "Africa, Asia". However, the bird does not occur in Africa, except perhaps in Linnaeus's time in Mediterranean coastal areas where they might have been introduced during the Roman Empire. The type locality was later fixed to the Rioni River in western Georgia, known as Phasis to the Ancient Greeks. These birds, until the modern era, constituted the bulk of the introduced stock in parts of Europe that was not already present; the birds described by Linnaeus's sources, though typically belonging to such early introductions, would certainly have more alleles in common with the transcaucasian population than with others. The scientific name is Latin for "pheasant from Colchis", colchicus referring to the west of modern-day Georgia; the Ancient Greek term corresponding to the English "pheasant" is Phasianos ornis (Φασιανὸς ὂρνις), "bird of the river Phasis". Although Linnaeus included many Galliformes in his genus Phasianius such as the domestic chicken and its wild ancestor the red junglefowl (Gallus gallus), only the common and the green pheasant have since been placed in this genus. As the latter was not known to Linnaeus in 1758, the common pheasant is treated as the type species of Phasianus.

In the US, common pheasants are widely known as "ring-necked pheasants". One North American writer called them "chinks" or, in Montana, "phezzens". In China, meanwhile, the species is properly called zhi ji (雉鸡), "pheasant-fowl", essentially implying the same as the English name "common pheasant". As elsewhere, P. colchicus is such a familiar bird in China that it is usually just referred to as shan ji (山雞), "mountain chicken", a Chinese term for pheasants in general.

As of 2005, it had the smallest known genome of all living amniotes, only 0.97 pg (970 million base pairs), roughly one-third of the human genome's size; however, the black-chinned hummingbird has the smallest known amniote genome.

=== Subspecies ===
There are about 30 subspecies in five to eight groups. These can be identified by the male plumage, namely presence or absence of a white neck-ring and/or a white superciliary stripe, the colour of the uppertail (rump) and wing coverts, and the colour of crown, chest, upper back, and flank feathers. As noted earlier, introduced populations have mixed the alleles of various races, differing according to the original stock used for introductions and what natural selection according to climate and habitat has made of that.

An investigation into the genetic relationships of subspecies suggested that the common pheasant originated from the forests of southeastern China. Initial divergence is thought to have occurred around 3.4 Mya. The lack of agreement between morphology-based subspecies delimitation and their genetic relationships is thought to be attributed to past isolation followed by more recent population mixing as the pheasant has expanded its range across the Palaearctic.

The subspecies groups, grouped within western and eastern clades, with some notable subspecies, are:

Subspecies	Range	Description	Image
Red-rumped pheasants (Western clade)		The lower back, rump, and upper tail-coverts are of a bronze-red, maroon, or rusty-orange general colour, sometimes glossed with oily green; black bars on the tail generally narrow.	
P. c. colchicus group – Black-necked pheasants: P. c. colchicus, P. c. septentrionalis, P. c. talischensis, P. c. persicus	Caucasus to W. Turkestan; early (Roman or pre-Roman) introduced into Turkey (Samsun area) and Greece (Nestos delta)	No neck ring. Wing coverts buff to brown (in P. c. persicus greyish white or buffy white), uppertail coverts rusty to chestnut	
P. c. chrysomelas / P. c. principalis group – White-winged pheasants: P. c. principalis, P. c. zarudnyi, P. c. zerafschanicus, P. c. bianchii, P. c. chrysomelas, P. c. shawii	Central Turkestan and western Tarim Basin	No or vestigial neck ring. Wing coverts whitish, uppertail coverts and general plumage hue bronze to brown	
P. c. mongolicus group – Kyrghyz pheasants: P. c. turcestanicus, P. c. mongolicus	NE Turkestan and adjacent Xinjiang. Despite its name, P. c. mongolicus does not occur in Mongolia.	Broad neck ring. Wing coverts white, uppertail coverts hue rusty to chestnut, general plumage hue copper	
P. c. tarimensis group – Tarim pheasants: P. c. tarimensis	SE Turkestan around the eastern Tarim Basin	No or vestigial neck ring. Wing coverts buff to brown, uppertail coverts dark khaki to light olive	
Grey-rumped pheasants (Eastern clade)		The lower back, rump, and upper tail-coverts are of a light and more or less lavender-blue, greenish- or yellowish-grey, or olive-greenish colour; a rusty orange patch on each side of the rump; black tail-bars generally broad.	
P. c. elegans group – Yunnan pheasants: P. c. elegans, P. c. rothschildi	Eastern Tibet, western Sichuan, northwestern and southeastern Yunnan, northwestern Vietnam and northern Myanmar.	White neck collar and orbital lines are absent. A broad band of richly glossed dark green or bluish green colour runs down the underparts, completely separating the brassy-chestnut of the sides of the chest. Crown dark green. Uppertail coverts light bluish grey.	
P. c. strauchi / P. c. vlangalii group – Western grey-rumped pheasants: P. c. suehschanensis, P. c. vlangalii, P. c. satscheuensis, P. c. edzinensis, P. c. strauchi, P. c. sohokhotensis, P. c. alaschanicus, P. c. kiangsuensis	Qaidam Basin, eastern Qinghai, northeastern Sichuan, Inner Mongolia, Gansu, Ningxia, Shanxi, Shaanxi, western Hebei. Note that, despite its name, P. c. kiangsuensis does not occur in Jiangsu.	The white neck collar and orbital lines are usually either absent (P. c. suehschanensis) or rather narrow, often not complete. Brassy-chestnut on chest dominating over glossy green colour (which only in P. c. suehschanensis reaches from foreneck to the belly). Crown usually dark green.	
P. c. torquatus group – Chinese ring-necked pheasants: P. c. hagenbecki, P. c. pallasi, P. c. karpowi, P. c. torquatus, P. c. takatsukasae, P. c. decollatus	Widespread in eastern China, extending to northernmost Vietnam in the south and to the Strait of Tartary region in the north; with an isolated population in north-western Mongolia. Absent from Hainan. Most pheasants introduced in North America are of this group.	White neck ring varies from broad in the north east (P. c. pallasi) to absent in the south west (P. c. decollatus). Wing coverts tan to light grey (almost white in some). Chest copper red to light brown red, in P. c. decollatus rich purple red with thick black feather margins. Crown varying from dark green without orbital lines (P. c. decollatus) to light grey framed with white orbital lines. In P. c. hagenbecki chest feathers broadly fringed black.	
P. c. formosanus group – Taiwan pheasants: P. c. formosanus	Taiwan	White neck ring interrupted at front neck. Flank feathers characteristically whitish or pure white with black apices and often narrow black margins. Feathers at chest broadly fringed black, giving a scaly appearance.	

Sometimes this species is split into the Central Asian common and the East Asian ring-necked pheasants, roughly separated by the arid and high mountainous regions of Turkestan. However, while the western and eastern populations probably were entirely separate during the Zyryanka glaciation when deserts were more extensive, this separation was not long enough for actual speciation to occur. The largest variety of colour patterns is found where the western and eastern populations mix, as is to be expected. Females usually cannot be identified even to subspecies group with certainty.

Within a maximum clade credibility mDNA gene tree, the most basal group is the P. c. elegans-group of the Eastern Clade, diverging from the green pheasant during the Calabrian, and diversifying in Middle Pleistocene around 0.7 million years ago, with the groups of the Western Clade splitting off from those of the Eastern Clade about 0.59 million years ago. While the subspecies of the Western Clade are well geographically separated from each other, the subspecies of the Eastern Clade often show clinal variation and large areas of intergradation. For example, clines connect P. c. pallasi-karpowi-torquatus-takatsukasae within the P. c. torquatus group and P. c. kiangsuensis-alaschanicus-sohokhotensis-strauchi within the P. c. strauchi-vlangalii group, with the degree of expression of white collar and superciliary stripe in both cases decreasing from north to south. The isolated form P. c. hagenbecki is very close to P. c. pallasi in phenotype, and has been traditionally treated within the P. c. torquatus group until recently, when it was assigned in one study to the P. c. strauchi / P. c. vlangalii group. However, the origin of the corresponding feather samples as listed in GenBank is far away from the known distribution of subspecies P. c. hagenbecki, and the issue needs further clarification.

Many subspecies are in danger of disappearing due to hybridisation with introduced birds. The last black-necked pheasant (P. c. colchicus) population in Europe survives in Greece in the delta of the river Nestos, where in 2012 the population was estimated 100–250 individuals.

== Relation to humans ==
The indigenous Paiwan people of Taiwan adorn motifs of the bird (tiativ in their language) on beams of their homes. Pheasant feathers are worn by commoners including skilled hunters even as far as elected politicians among Paiwan commoners in modern times, in contrast to mountain hawk-eagle feathers reserved for hereditary chiefs (mamazangilan).

=== Cultivation ===
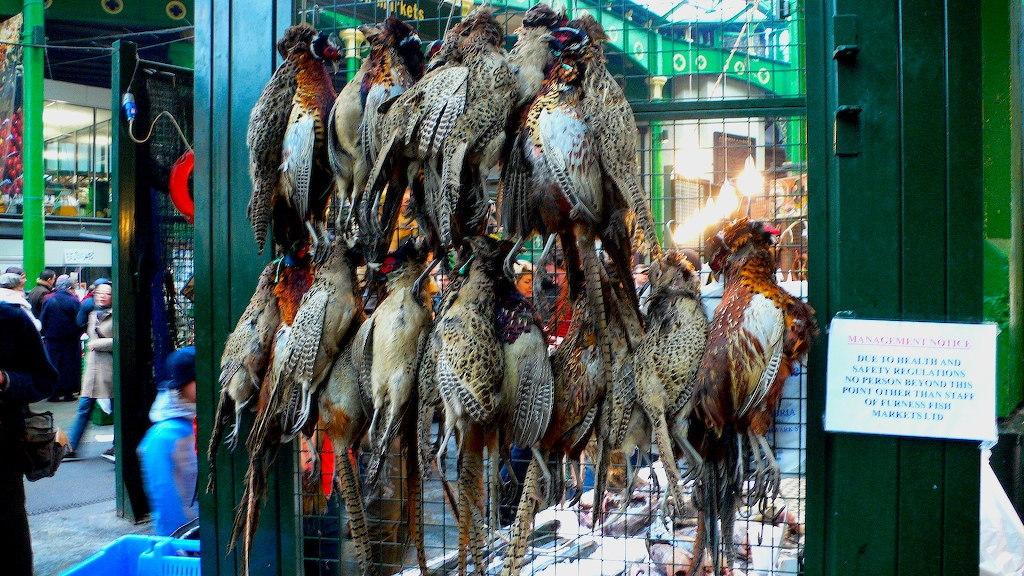
Pheasants strung up at the Borough Market

Pheasant farming is a common practice and is frequently done intensively, with serious adverse impacts on native species. Birds are supplied both to hunting preserves/estates and restaurants, with smaller numbers being available for home cooks.

In the United Kingdom, about 50 million pheasants reared in captivity are released each summer, a number which has significantly increased since the 1980s. Most of these birds are shot during the open season (1 October to 1 February), and few survive for a year. The result is a wildly fluctuating population, from 50 million in July to less than 5 million in June.

==== Management strategies ====
A variety of management strategies have been suggested for areas that are home to species that are particularly threatened by pheasants, such as the prairie chickens and grey partridge. These strategies include mowing grass to decrease the nesting cover preferred by pheasants, decreasing pheasant roosting habitat, shooting pheasants in organised hunts, trapping and removing them from areas where there are high concentrations of birds of threatened species, and others.

While pheasant populations are not in any danger in the United States, they have been decreasing over the last 30 years, largely in agricultural areas. This is likely due to changes in farming practices, application of pesticides, habitat fragmentation, and increased predation due to changes in crops grown. Many crops beneficial for pheasants (such as barley) are not being farmed as much in favour of using the land for more lucrative crops, such as nut trees. Many of these new crops are detrimental to pheasant survival. Pheasants prefer to nest in areas of significant herbaceous cover, such as perennial grasses, so many agricultural areas are no longer conducive to nesting. Pheasant hens also experience higher levels of predation in areas without patches of grassland.

=== As gamebirds ===
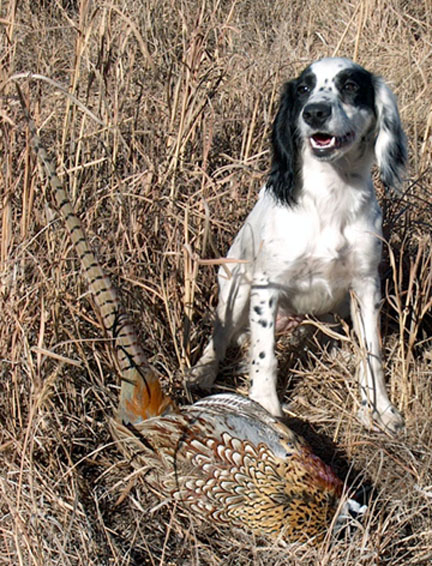
English cocker spaniel with pheasant quarry

Common pheasants are bred to be hunted and are shot in great numbers in Europe, especially the UK, where they are shot on the traditional formal "driven shoot" principles, whereby paying guns have birds driven over them by beaters, and on smaller "rough shoots". The open season in the UK is 1 October – 1 February, under the Game Act 1831 (1 & 2 Will. 4. c. 32). Generally they are shot by hunters employing gun dogs to help find, flush and retrieve shot birds. Retrievers, spaniels and pointing breeds are used to hunt pheasants.

The doggerel "Up gets a guinea, bang goes a penny-halfpenny, and down comes a half a crown" reflects the expensive sport of 19th century driven shoots in Britain, when pheasants were often shot for sport, rather than as food. It was a popular royal pastime in Britain to shoot common pheasants. King George V shot over 1,000 pheasants out of a total bag of 3,937 over a six-day period in December 1913 during a competition with a friend; however, he did not do enough to beat him.

Common pheasants are traditionally a target of small game poachers in the UK. The Roald Dahl novel Danny the Champion of the World featured a mechanic and his son who poached common pheasants from a local game preserve.

The carcasses were often hung for a time to improve the meat by slight decomposition, as with most other game. Modern cookery generally uses moist roasting and farm-raised female birds.

== See also ==
- Hunting and shooting in the United Kingdom
- Fisherian Runaway
