= Autumn Song =

Autumn Song may refer to:

- "Chanson d'automne", an 1866 poem by Paul Verlaine
- Autumn Song (Mannheim Steamroller album), released in 2003
- Autumn Song (Mose Allison album), released in 1959
- "Autumnsong", a song by Manic Street Preachers from their 2007 album Send Away the Tigers
- "Autumn Song", a song by God Is an Astronaut from the 2013 album Origins

== See also ==
- "A Song of Autumn", poem by Adam Lindsay Gordon set to music by Edward Elgar
- "Autumn" (Strawbs song) by Strawbs, from their 1974 album Hero and Heroine
