= Birdsong (surname) =

Birdsong is an English surname. Notable people with the surname include:

- Bob Birdsong (born 1948), American former bodybuilder
- Carl Birdsong (born 1959), American former professional footballer
- Cindy Birdsong (born 1939), American singer
- Craig Birdsong (born 1964), American former professional footballer
- Edwin Birdsong (1941–2019), American keyboardist and organist
- Gary Birdsong, American fundamentalist preacher
- Hayden Birdsong (born 2001), American professional baseball player
- Jimmy Birdsong (1925–2013), American politician
- Joseph Birdsong (born 1988), American singer, songwriter, member of electropop duo Candy Coded
- Joyce Birdsong (Joyce Beatty, born 1950), American politician
- Keith Birdsong (1959–2019), Native American illustrator
- Larry Birdsong (1934–1990), American R&B singer
- Mary Birdsong (born 1968), American actress
- Mia Birdsong, American activist
- Otis Birdsong (born 1955), American former professional basketball player

== See also ==
- Ricky Byrdsong (1956–1999), American college basketball coach and murder victim
- Birdsong (disambiguation)
