= Summer Song (album) =

Studio album by Mannheim Steamroller
- Released: 2001, 2024
- Genre: Ambient
- Length: 50:20
- Label: American Gramaphone
- Producer: Chip Davis

Mannheim Steamroller chronology
Christmas Extraordinaire (2001)	Summer Song (2001)	Romantic Melodies (2002)

Summer Song is part two of Chip Davis' three part Ambience collection (preceded by 2001's Bird Song and followed by Autumn Song in 2003). It was released in 2001 on CD by American Gramaphone and features seven summer-themed tracks.

The Ambience collection is a series of natural recordings with musical elements composed by Davis. In June 2024, the album was re-released on digital streaming platforms. According to the press release, the digital version is "the first in 'spatial audio', which is what Chip was envisioning 25+ years ago when he began this project."

== Track listing ==
All tracks are written by Chip Davis.

No.	Title	Length
1.	"A Clearing"	4:50
2.	"Raindance"	6:10
3.	"Teardrops Raindrops"	7:55
4.	"Sun in the Rain"	10:35
5.	"Midday Reflection"	7:20
6.	"Summer Song"	8:00
7.	"Bittersweet"	6:10
Total length:		50:20

== Personnel ==
- Chip Davis – Composer, Engineer, Primary Artist, Producer
- Brian Ackley & David Cwirko – Digital Mixing, Editing, Mastering
- Bobby Jenkins – Oboe
