= Bird Song (Mannheim Steamroller album) =

Studio album by Mannheim Steamroller
- Released: 2001
- Genre: Ambient
- Length: 49:38
- Label: American Gramaphone
- Producer: Chip Davis

Mannheim Steamroller chronology
Fresh Aire 8 (2000)	Bird Song (2001)	Christmas Extraordinaire (2001)

Bird Song is part one of Mannheim Steamroller's three part Ambience collection (followed by Summer Song & Autumn Song). It was released in 2001 on CD & DVD by American Gramaphone and features eight bird song tracks.

The Ambience collection is a series of natural recordings with musical elements composed by Chip Davis, who also recorded the nature sounds & produced the album. Brian Ackley & Dave Cwirko mastered, mixed & edited it.

== Track listing ==
All tracks are written by Chip Davis.

No.	Title	Length
1.	"Awakening"	6:54
2.	"Another Time"	6:46
3.	"Cherry Blossoms"	5:35
4.	"Wooley Green"	5:16
5.	"The Hunt"	10:36
6.	"Green Lace"	5:42
7.	"Childhood Memory"	5:08
8.	"Big Bird"	5:01
Total length:		49:38

== Personnel ==
- Chip Davis – percussion
- Bobby Jenkins – oboe
- Jackson Berkey – keyboards
- Almeda Berkey – keyboards
- Roxanne Layton – percussion, woodwinds
- Ron Cooley – guitar, bass guitar
- Arnie Roth – strings
- Chuck Penington – orchestra conductor
