= Autumn Song (Mannheim Steamroller album) =

Studio album by Mannheim Steamroller
- Released: September 15, 2003
- Genre: Ambient
- Length: 49:32
- Label: American Gramaphone
- Producer: Chip Davis

Mannheim Steamroller chronology
Romantic Melodies (2002)	Autumn Song (2003)	Christmas Celebration (2004)

Autumn Song is part three of Mannheim Steamroller's Ambience collection (preceded by Bird Song & Summer Song, both from 2001). It was released in 2003 on CD & DVD by American Gramaphone, and features eight autumnal tracks.

The Ambience collection is a series of natural recordings with musical elements composed by Chip Davis.

Back cover excerpt: "Recall memories of another time. Autumn Song features the unique sounds of the season, from a harvest celebration to leaves scurrying across nature's floor."

== Track listing ==
All tracks are written by Chip Davis.

No.	Title	Length
1.	"Remembering Castles"	6:49
2.	"Walking in Straw Grass"	7:25
3.	"The Crow Knows (or just be caw caw cause)"	5:37
4.	"Blowing Leaves"	7:08
5.	"Harvest Dance"	12:40
6.	"Golden Sunset"	5:48
7.	"Full Moon"	4:06
8.	"Wooden Tent"	1:19
Total length:		49:32

== Personnel ==
- Composed By, Nature Sounds Recorded By – Chip Davis
- Mixed By, Edited By, Mastered By – Brian Ackley, Dave Cwirko
- Oboe – Bobby Jenkins
