= Giovanni Pietro Olina =

Giovanni Pietro Olina (1585 - circa 1645) was an Italian naturalist, lawyer, and theologian best known for his writings on the capture and maintenance of songbirds in the rare work Uccelliera, overo, Discorso della natura, e proprieta di diversi uccelli (1622) which was written (or ghost-written) at the behest of, and with the support of Cassiano dal Pozzo who worked under Pope Urbano VIII.

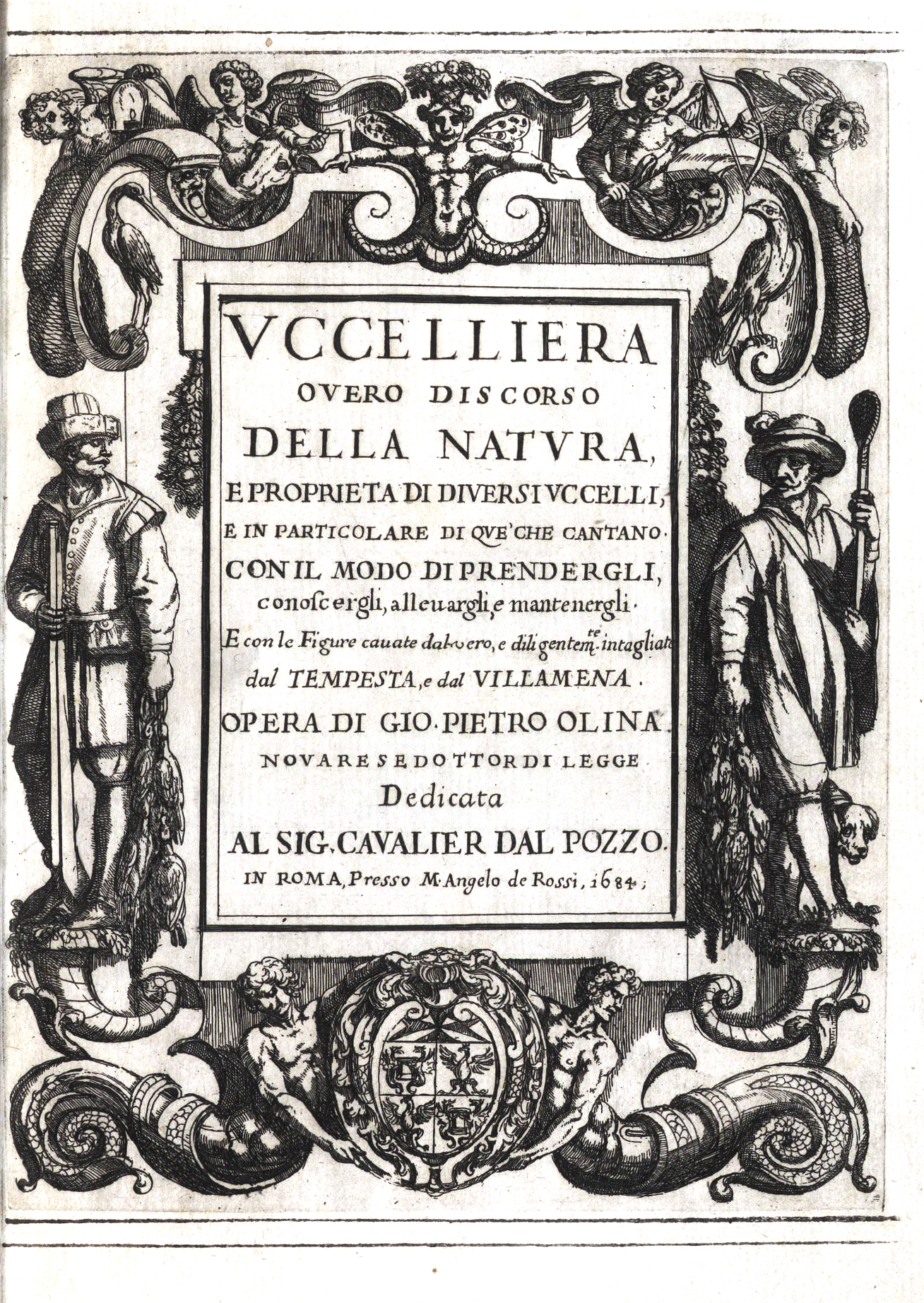
Cover of Uccelliera 1684 edition

Very little is known of the life of Olina. He took a keen interest in hunting and graduated from Siena in letters, theology and philosophy. He served in the court of Cassiano dal Pozzo in Rome before moving to Novara where he served as canon at the cathedral. He is thought to have died in January 1645.

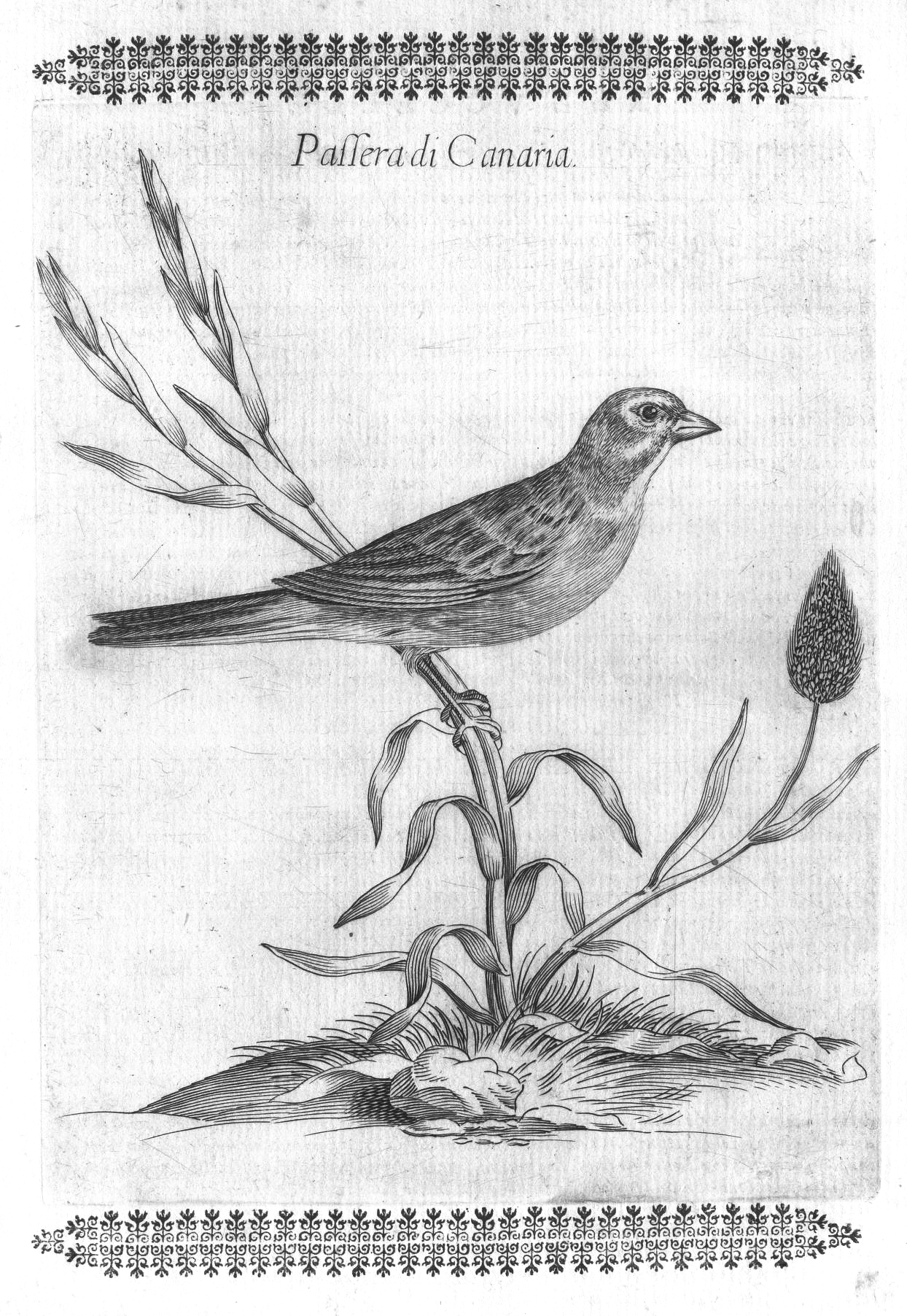
Among the earliest illustrations of the canary is one from Olina

Cassiano and his younger brother Carlo Antonio were collectors of objects of natural history. Cassiano used this book Uccelliera first published in 1622 as proof of his expertise to join the Accademia dei Lincei. Giovanni Pietro Olina was a good friend and much of the material in the book was written by Cassiano and many of the etchings were based on watercolours made for Cassiano by Vincenzo Leonardi. Cassiano based much of the book on the work (so much so that it has been considered as plagiarism) of Antonio Valli da Todi's 1601 work Il Canto degli Uccelli, a rare work of which one copy belonged to Cardinal Del Monte, a friend of Cassiano. It is thought that Cassiano did not want to add himself as a co-author along with Olina due to fears that his motives might be misunderstood and be used to target him during the Inquisition. Cassiano's discorsi (discourses) included notes on lammergeiers, hummingbirds, Dalmatian pelicans, and flamingos. Olina's book also describes and illustrates the netting of birds, the use of decoys and so on. The Uccelliera includes careful instructions for the skinning and preservation of birds.

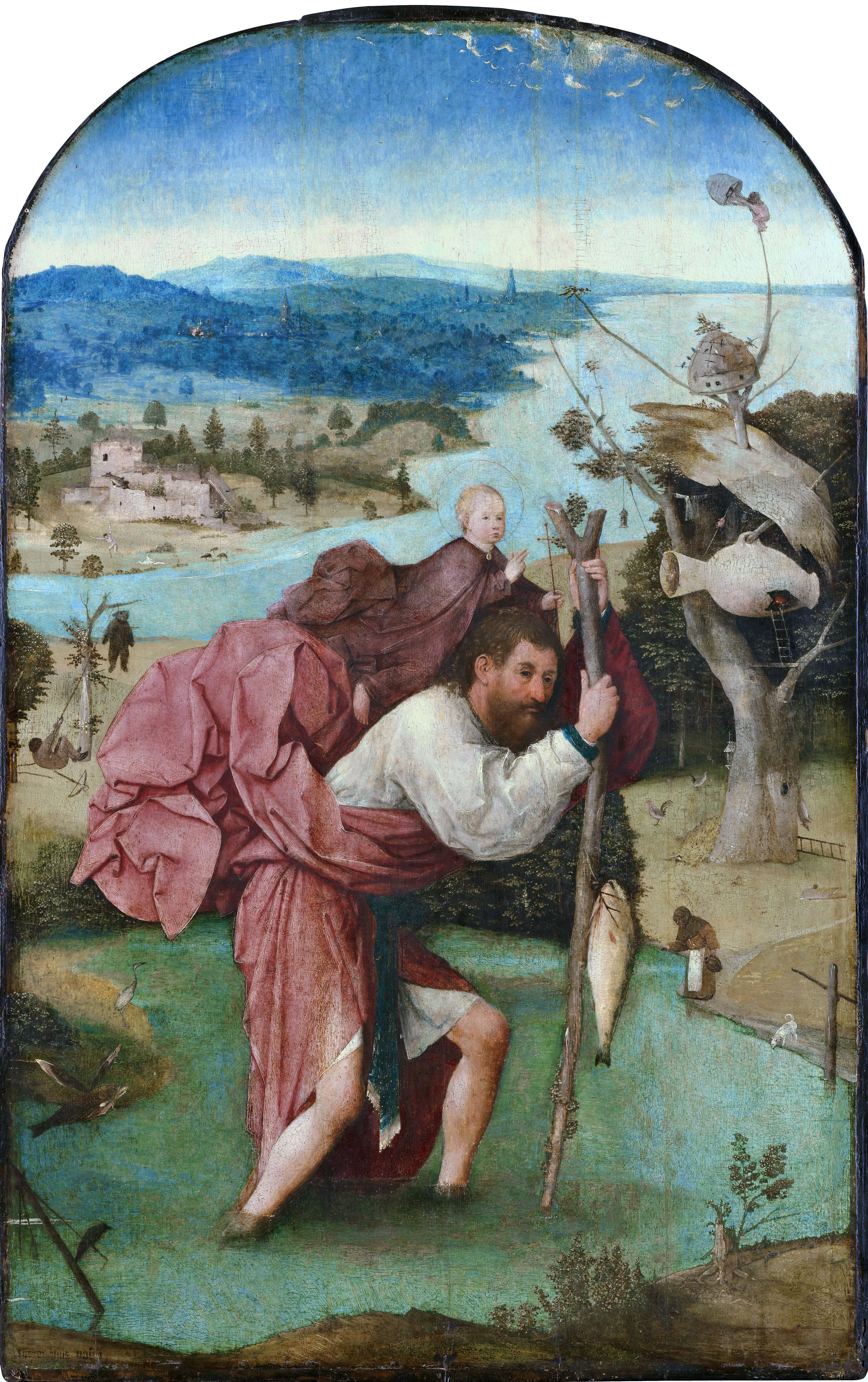
Painting by Hieronymus Bosch, c. 1500 which includes a picture of a vase hanting from a tree meant for starlings to nest in.

Olina also described Italian traditions including the use of hanging horizontal vases (Fiaminghi) for starlings to nest in. Some vases were also embedded into the walls.

Olina's books are thought to include one of the earliest and most accurate illustrations of the canary. Todi and Olina included a story of how canaries came into Europe as a result of an alleged shipwreck from the Canary Islands of the island of Elba. Todi suggested that the island of Elba had cross-bred birds from the escaped canaries. A study of some paintings of the supposed "Elba canary" have however subsequently been ascribed to the Corsican race of the citril finch.
