= Birdsong (short story) =

2010 short story by Chimamanda Ngozi Adichie

"Birdsong" is a 2010 short story by Chimamanda Ngozi Adichie. It was first published in The New Yorker.

== Sources ==
- Opoku-Agyemang (2013). ""Rituals of Distrust": Illicit Affairs and Metaphors of Transport in Ama Ata Aidoo's "Two Sisters" and Chimamanda Ngozi Adichie's "Birdsong"". Research in African Literatures. 44 (4): 69. doi:10.2979/reseafrilite.44.4.69.
