= Moonlight (EP) =

EP by Candy Coded
- Released: September 15, 2015
- Recorded: 2014–2015
- Genre: Electropop
- Length: 13:18
- Label: CANDY CODED
- Producer: Sam Antonioli

Singles from Moonlight
- 1. "Midnight Moonlight" Released: September 15, 2015

Moonlight is the debut release and extended play by American electropop project Candy Coded. It was released on iTunes and other media outlets on September 15, 2015.

The first single from the extended play, "Midnight Moonlight", was also released on September 15, 2015.

== Background, recording and composition ==
Moonlight was produced solely by Sam Antonioli and Joseph Birdsong is credited to have written every song. Candy Coded announced the title and released date of their debut extended play on September 3, 2015. Birdsong unveiled the artwork via Instagram on September 10, 2015. The cover was taken from the music video for "Midnight Moonlight".

On making the extended play, the duo said that they took a lot of breaks due to other commitments and wanting to go at their own pace. Antonioli was in favor of this saying that, "Sometimes when I’m mixing through a song and I’ve heard it three hundred times, [Birdsong's] voice just turns into another instrument to me, I forget there is meaning in the things that [he's] saying… So after a couple of months of not listening to these songs and coming back to them, Joe and I both had this reaction of just like, 'this sounds really good,' I forgot how good this was and I’m listening to the lyrics again thinking, 'wow, this actually makes sense’." He also said that "the songs morphed and moved with [him] through ups and downs" in his life. Birdsong praised Antonioli by saying, "I definitely think this is some of [the] best, if not [the] best, music work you have ever done." Antonioli reciprocated saying that, "the lyrics are such a wonderful contrast to the music."

=== Songs ===
"Midnight Moonlight" was released as the lead single from Moonlight on the same day, along with a music video directed by gobouPTA on YouTube. It was the first song to be written and composed by Candy Coded. Joseph Birdsong took his lyrical inspiration from "walking down the street at night" in Philadelphia. He compared the song to "Come On Sugar" (Birdsong's solo 2010 song) due to its up-beat and hopeful themes. He also added that it was a different writing process for him as "the majority of [his] songs are about being depressed". Of the lyric structure, Birdsong joked saying that "Midnight Moonlight" is "not the most lyrically extensive song that [he] has ever written", comparing it to "Spending All My Time" by Perfume. Sam Antonioli worked on the production for a year and a half whereas Birdsong recorded his vocals in a day. He admitted to being a "perfectionist" and having to eventually accept that the song was "as good as it’s going to be and declare it as done".

"All the Time" is the second track on the extended play. Antonioli worked on the track for a year and described it as "beat boppy and electronic". He explained that he had to slow down the music by fifty percent during the recording process, as Birdsong found it difficult to enunciate each word in the chorus, and then sped up the vocals in production. Birdsong said that the song is about not being able to get someone off your mind.

"Wonder" is the third track on the extended play. Birdsong recalls looping a beat from a Lorde song to help him write the lyrics. Antonioli later changed the speed and key because it was out of Birdsong's vocal range and sounded too "bassy". Birdsong described the song as "80s sounding" with "cool synths" added by Antonioli. In a tweet, Birdsong said the lyrics to "Wonder" are "practically a journal entry" of his. The working titles for the song were "Lonely" and "I Wonder".

== Track listing ==
All tracks are written by Joseph Birdsong and Sam Antonioli (respectively)

No.	Title	Length
1.	"Midnight Moonlight"	4:33
2.	"All the Time"	4:23
3.	"Wonder"	4:21
Total length:		13:18

== Personnel ==
- Sam Antonioli — producer, composer, mixing, mastering
- Joseph Birdsong — vocals, backing vocals, lyrics
