= Fresh Aire 8 =

Studio album by Mannheim Steamroller
- Released: August 22, 2000
- Recorded: 1999–2000
- Genre: New age
- Length: 53:51
- Label: American Gramaphone
- Producer: Chip Davis

Mannheim Steamroller chronology
25 Year Celebration of Mannheim Steamroller (1999)	Fresh Aire 8 (2000)	Christmas Extraordinaire (2001)

Professional ratings
Review scores
Source	Rating
Allmusic	2.5/5 stars

Fresh Aire 8 is an album by Mannheim Steamroller, released in 2000. It is the final album in the Fresh Aire series and is based on the topic of infinity, with each track or suite representing a different "aspect of infinity." The tracks' topics include ancient Greek philosophy, Leonardo da Vinci, M. C. Escher's Waterfall, Mannheim Steamroller's mascot, and the Judgment of Anubis. A visual album was also released on DVD.

== Track listing ==
All tracks are written by Chip Davis.

Fresh Aire 8 track listing
No.	Title	Length
1.	"Main Titles"	2:43
2.	"Day Party"	3:09
3.	"Interlude 8"	3:12
4.	"Night Party"	2:41
5.	"Goddesses in the Forest (Note: Tracks 2–5 make up the "Greek Thinkers Suite," representing "Infinity in Philosophy.")"	2:37
6.	"The Big Bang" (Infinity in Cosmology)	6:48
7.	"Leonardo" (The Infinite Thinker)	3:21
8.	"Fractals" (Infinity in Mathematics)	6:45
9.	"Waterfall" (Infinity in Art)	4:19
10.	"The Circle of Love" (Infinity in the Wedding Band)	5:41
11.	"The Steamroller" (Infinity in Music)	4:38
12.	"The Heart and the Feather" (Infinity in the Egyptian Afterlife)	7:36

== Personnel ==
Credits adapted from liner notes.

- Chip Davis – composer, producer, arranger, conductor
- London Symphony Orchestra
- Jackson Berkey – piano solo on "The Circle of Love"
- Arnie Roth – violin solo on "The Circle of Love"
- Moray Welsh – cello solo on "The Circle of Love"
- Tom Hartig – saxophone on "The Steamroller"
