= Candy Coded =

American electropop

- Origin: Missoula, Montana and Little Rock, Arkansas, United States
- Genres: Electropop; dance; pop
- Years active: 2015—present
- Label: CANDY CODED
- Members: Sam Antonioli; Joseph Birdsong

Candy Coded (stylized as CANDY CODED) is an American electropop music project formed in 2015 from Missoula, Montana and Little Rock, Arkansas. The duo is composed of record producer Sam Antonioli and singer-songwriter Joseph Birdsong. The band released their debut extended play, Moonlight, on September 15, 2015.

Candy Coded also host a weekly podcast called The Show with Sam & Joe.

== History ==
=== 2010–2014: Beginnings ===
Although not officially forming until 2015, Joseph Birdsong's debut album Young & Free, Pt. 1 (2010), released through DFTBA Records on December 7, 2010, was produced by Sam Antonioli, as well as several non-album singles including "New Queen Bee", "Digital Dream" and "Sticks and Stones".

Antonioli and Birdsong founded The Show with Sam & Joe in April 2014. Described as a "totes casual podcast", episodes of the show are posted weekly onto iTunes Store and SoundCloud. The first episode was posted on May 15, 2014.

In June 2014, Antonioli and Birdsong previewed a snippet of their new song "Midnight Moonlight". Birdsong confirmed in a video on his YouTube channel in October 2014 that he and Antonioli were working on new music together. He stated that the new music was his "favorite stuff that [they] have ever done musically" therefore wanting to perfect the new material by not giving themselves a deadline.

=== 2015–present: Moonlight ===
During a podcast for The Show with Sam & Joe on September 3, 2015, San Antonioli and Joseph Birdsong announced that they were to release new music under the name Candy Coded. It took the duo "a good month and a half” to choose a name and decided on Candy Coded (a play on "candy coated") because the music is “dancey and candy-ish". Candy Coded explained that because they had "equal parts" in composing Birdsong's past solo music that they wanted to release music as a group. Antonioli said the new music "doesn't sound like anything else that [they've] made before" and Birdsong also expressed how his name “doesn't fit this kind of music anymore”. Moonlight (2015) was confirmed to be the title of their debut extended play, along with the lead single "Midnight Moonlight". "All the Time" and "Wonder" were also confirmed to be the tracks on the extended play. Birdsong unveiled the artwork via Instagram on September 10, 2015. Alongside the release of Moonlight on September 15, 2015, Candy Coded also released the music video for "Midnight Moonlight", directed by gobouPTA, via YouTube.

== Members ==
=== Sam Antonioli ===
Sam Tanner Antonioli (born December 15, 1993 (age 32) in Helena, Montana, United States) is a freelance music producer and audio engineer. Antonioli has released three solo extended plays Sonic Blue (2010), Ultra Red (2011) and Hyper Green (2011) as well as a compilation album Colorous (2014). He attended the Berklee College of Music studying Electronic Production and Design.

Solo discography

- Sonic Blue (2010)
- Ultra Red (2011)
- Hyper Green (2011)

=== Joseph Birdsong ===
Joseph Thomas Birdsong (born January 27, 1988 (age 38) in Little Rock, Arkansas, United States) is a singer, songwriter and YouTuber. Birdsong started posting videos onto YouTube under the name Disneykid1 (now as Joseph Birdsong) in January 2007 gaining over 100,000 subscribers and 13.5 million views. He created a gaming channel in August 2012 called DK1games that has gained over eight thousand subscribers and over half a million views. Birdsong also had his own series on several YouTube channels including 5awesomegays, My Damn Channel for Answerly and The Stylish. Birdsong has released one solo album Young & Free, Pt. 1 (2010) and a compilation album A Year of Singles (2012). He studied at the Art Institute of Philadelphia and the University of Central Arkansas, earning degrees in Visual Merchandising and Creative Writing respectively.

Solo discography

- Young & Free, Pt. 1 (2010)

== Discography ==
=== Extended plays ===
| Title | Album details |
|---|---|
| Moonlight | Released: September 15, 2015; Label: Self-released; Format: Digital download |

=== Singles ===
| Title | Year | Album |
|---|---|---|
| "Midnight Moonlight" | 2015 | Moonlight |

=== Music videos ===
| Year | Song | Album | Director | Link |
|---|---|---|---|---|
| 2015 | "Midnight Moonlight" | Moonlight | gobouPTA | |
