= Antonio Valli da Todi =

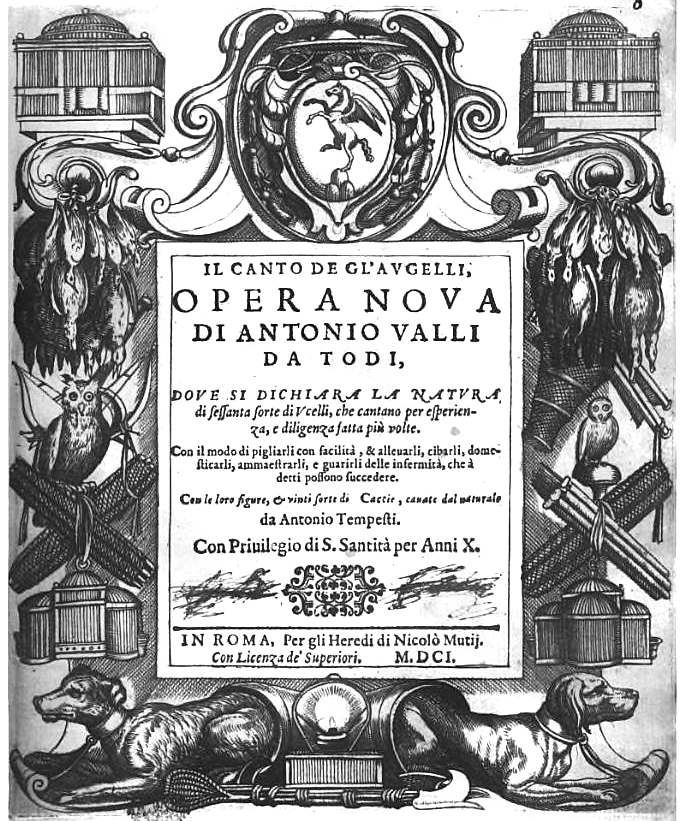
Title page of Il Canto degl'Augelli (1601)

Antonio Valli da Todi (fl. 1600) was an Italian fowler and writer noted for the book Il Canto degl'Augelli (Italian, 'The song of the birds'), (1601).

The book deals with the capture, maintenance, and training of about sixty species of song birds. It also includes notes on methods for trapping and hunting birds, including the use of decoys, nets, owls, and falcons. It also included methods to maintain birds and to stimulate them to sing.

The book included illustrations by Antonio Tempesta Valli's achievements included the recognition and understanding of bird song and the maintenance of territory. He noted that the territory of a singing nightingale was “un tiro di sasso lontano dove canta” - about a circle as wide as a long throw of a stone.

Valli's book served as a source for several other Italian works on birds. This includes Giovanni Pietro Olina;s 1622 work Uccelliera, which plagiarised considerable portions of Valli's book and achieved greater popularity.

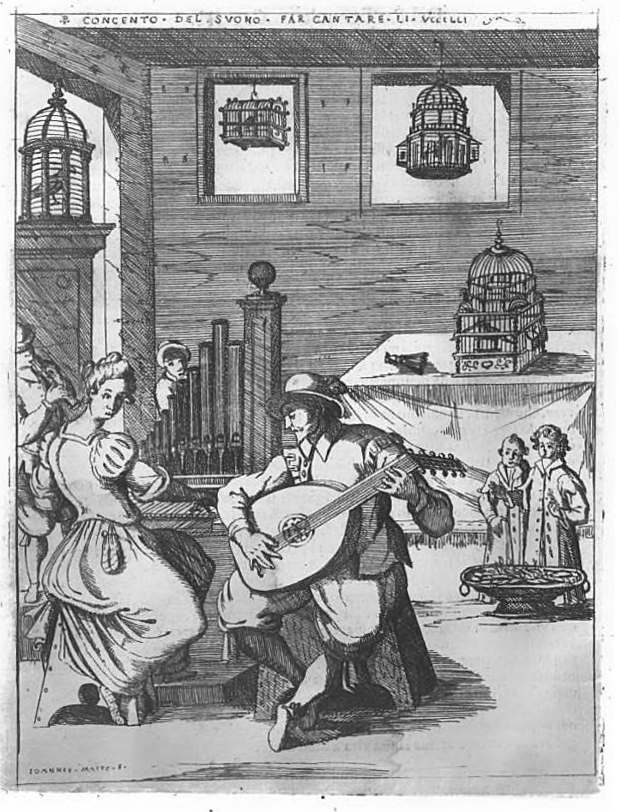
Playing music to teach songbirds

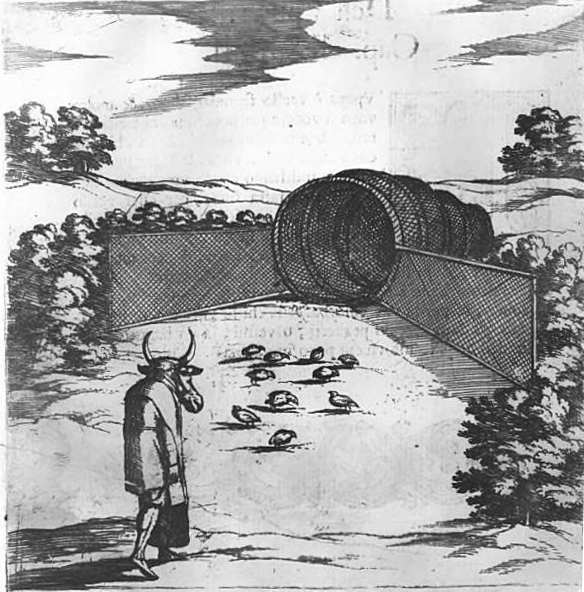
Driving birds into nets

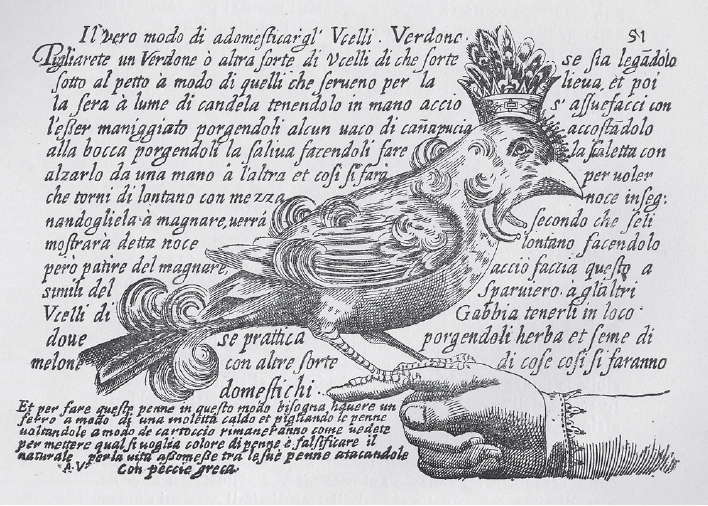
Cage bird "dressage"
