= List of compositions by Gregory Short =

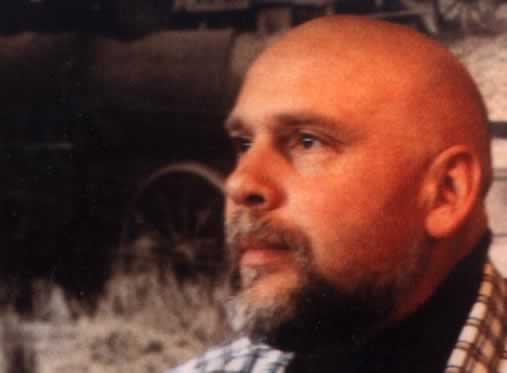
Short in 1999

This is a list of compositions by Gregory Short (August 14, 1938 – April 1, 1999). Recorded works are marked with an asterisk (*).

== Chamber music ==
- "Blue Dawn" for Violin, Clarinet and Piano - Original music imitating three American musical personalities
  - Violin is Appalachian fiddle music
  - Clarinet is Blues
  - Piano is classical avant-garde music
- “Dialogue" for Violin and Mallet Percussion (Vibraphone/Marimba)
  1. Dialogue (Violin/Vibraphone)
  2. Dumpin' It In (Marimba solo)
  3. Intermezzo (Violin solo)
  4. Perpetual Motion (Violin/Xylophone)
- “Duo Sonata” for Flute and Piano
  1. Intertwined
  2. For Old Times’ Sake
  3. Voices Form Within
  4. Resolution
- "In Praise of Darkness" for Tuba and Piano
  1. Frightening
  2. Of Dreams
  3. Night Life
- "Metaphors" for String Quartet No. 1
  1. Portrait
  2. Soaring
  3. Declamation
  4. Waltz
  5. Epilogue

(For more chamber music, see Sonatas In Tribute)

== Choral ==
- "A Cradle Hymn" Multiple Division Chorus and Organ (Isaac Watts)
- "Welcome Carol" Women’s Voices (Richard Crashaw)
- "Mass (liturgy)" Large Chorus and Percussion including hand bells
  - Kyrie eleison
  - Gloria
  - Credo (with congregation/audience participation)
  - Sanctus
  - Hosana
  - Agnus Dei (with electronic tape delay and congregation/audience participation)

== Concerti ==
- "American" Concerto No. 1 for Piano and Orchestra
  1. In Tribute to George Gershwin
  2. In tribute to Henry Cowell
  3. In tribute to Edward MacDowell
  4. In Tribute to Charles Ives
- "Sequoia" Concerto No. 2 for Piano and Wind Ensemble
  1. Song of the Rain (Navajo), Mocking Bird (Yuma), Steal-Each-Other Dance (Creek)
  2. Oh Great Forest (Seneca)
  3. Rain Song (Hopi), Crow dance Song (Arapaho), Song of Rejoicing and Thanksgiving (Pawnee)
- "Concerto" for Symphonic Wind Ensemble
  1. March (tutti)
  2. Lament for Wood Winds
  3. Toccata for Brass
  4. Sounding for Percussion
  5. Serenade for Saxophones
  6. Finale (tutti)

== Instrumental Solo ==
- "A Passing of the Sun" for Solo Viola
- "Apotheosis of Saint Paul" for Toccata for Organ
- "Dragon Child" for Harp
- "I Heard the Owl" for Solo Flute
- “Rhapsody” for Solo Cello
- “Soliloquy” for Solo Contrabass
- "Tears of Heaven" Organ
- "Vistas" for Low Brass Instruments (4 euphonium, 4 trombone, 4 tuba)

== Orchestral Poems ==
- “Farewell Duet” Orchestra based on Broken Wings by Kahlil Gibran from a projected opera
- "Fog Woman" for Orchestra (Tlingit story)
  1. Raven Is Fishing
  2. Mist and Fog Woman's Song
  3. Raven and Fog Woman
  4. Becoming As One
  5. Dance of Sparkling Salmon
  6. The Relationship Sours
  7. Raven's Fit of Rage and Fog Woman's Resolve
  8. Final Song
  9. Fog Woman Dissolves
- "From Dust We Came...." for Wind Ensemble, Rock/Folk/Jazz Ensembles, Reader, Audience Participation and Delay (audio effect)
- “Germany” Large Orchestra with Organ based on German classical, folk and popular melodies
  1. Rhine River
  2. Oktoberfest
  3. Cathedrals
  4. Schwartzwald
- “Hobbit Preludes” Large Orchestra based on The Hobbit and The Fellowship of the Ring by J. R. R. Tolkien (Book 1)
  1. Middle Earth and Bilbo's Long Expected Party
  2. Dwarves March
  3. Spiders of Mirkwood
  4. Crossing the Misty Mountains
  5. Mines of Moria
  6. Lothloraine
- Northwest Tetralogy for Orchestra
  1. * “Mount Tacoma|Mount Takhoma” Orchestra
  2. * "The Raven Speaks" Suite for Orchestra based on Northwest Coastal Forest Native American Songs and Dances: I. Coastal Forest and Raven: Cradle Song (Kwakiutl), Totem Pole (Kwakiutl); II. Totem Pole (Haida); III. Hat game (Tlingit); IV. Love Song (Tlingit); V. Grandmother Rock and the Little Crabs (Lummi); VI. Northern Lights and Raven: Lullaby for a Boy (Tsimshian), She Will Gather Roses (Tsimshian)
  3. * "Bridge of the Gods, The Warrior Who Became A Mountain" Concerto for Percussion and Orchestra, plus Piano Transcription (Nisqually) - Pahto's Call, Wyeast's Challenge, Newit's Warning, Combat, Pahto's Death, Newit's Lament, Mountain Transfiguration, Spirits Within
  4. "Chief Seattle" Orator and Orchestra with Folk Instruments: - Chief Seattle's 1854 speech recited while the orchestra presents its ideas and images in sound.
- “Salute: To the Men and Women of the American Armed Forces” for Band arranged from the first movement of the "American Bicentennial" Sonata No. 4 for Piano
- ”Tehame” Suite for Band - Based on Native American Songs and Dances suitable for high school and college band
  1. Round Dance (Kiowa)
  2. Duck Dance (Seminole)
  3. Riding Song (Navajo)
  4. Night Is Here (Cherokee)
  5. Totem Pole (Haida)

== Piano Solo ==
- "American Sonatinas"
  1. Folk Sonatina - Thanks for My Pony (Cheyenne), Cotton-Eyed Joe (Afro-American), Song of the Three 'Nots' (Guizhou Province, China), Skip to My Lou
  2. Northeast Sonatina - Chester (William Billings), Blow the Wind Southerly, Yankee Doodle, Battle Hymn of the Republic
  3. Southeast Sonatina - Sometimes I Feel Like a Motherless Child (Afro-American), Old Blue, Mister Rabbit (Afro-American), The Fox
  4. Midwest Sonatina - The Bigler, Buffalo Gals, Little Prairie Dog (Hopi), Indian Christmas Carol (French)
  5. Northwest Sonatina - Totem Pole (Haida), Hat Game (Thlinget), Love Song (Thlinget), Lullaby (Quinault (tribe)), Grandmother Rock and the Little Crabs (Lummi), Totem Pole (Kwakiutl)
  6. Southwest Sonatina - Riding Song (Navajo), Chiapanecas (Mexico), The Cowboy's Lament: Streets of Laredo, Git Along Little Doggies
- "Four Horsemen of the Apocalypse"
  1. On A White Horse
  2. On A Red Horse
  3. On A Black Horse
  4. On A Pale Horse for amplified piano
- The Man Who Married The Eagle (Haida) for Piano
- Transcriptions for Students
  - Carnival of the Animals (suite), Camille Saint-Saëns
  - Overture to the Flying Dutchman, Richard Wagner
  - Chorus of Dervishes from The Ruins of Athens, Ludwig van Beethoven
  - Classics for Piano (Volume I, early)
  - Classics for Piano (Volume II, intermediate)
  - Classics for Piano (Volume III, advanced)
- Twenty-Four Tonal Preludes in all keys (1965–1966)

== Piano Sonatas ==
- "Fantasy" Sonata No. 1 (1956–58): in one movement
- "Ballad" Sonata No. 2 (1960)
  1. Kemberly
  2. Shiobhan
- "Etude" Sonata No. 3 (1972, from sketches of 1966-68)
  1. Allegro dramatico
  2. Adagio cantabile
  3. Con brio
- "American Bicentennial" Sonata No. 4 (1976)
  1. When Johnny Comes Marching Home, Chester (William Billings)
  2. The Sow Took The Measles and She Died In the Spring, My Sweetheart's A Mule In the Mine, Froggie Went A Courtin'
  3. Holy Song (Lakota people), Song of Healing (Navajo), Death, Ain't You Got Not Shame, Everybody Loves the Spring (China), Lullaby (Mexico)
  4. The Ballad of John Henry
- "Spirituals" Sonata No.5 (1980) in one movement - Swing Low Sweet Chariot, The Gospel Trains a Comin', Ezekiel Saw the Wheel, Heav'n Heav'n, Give Me That Old Time Religion, I Couldn't hear Nobody Pray
- "Women Out West" Sonata No. 6 (1986)
  1. Darlin' Cory, Hang Town Gals, Women's Song of Rejoicing (Pawnee)
  2. Black Is the Color of My True Love's Hair, The Riddle Song (I gave My Love a Cherry), Single Girl
  3. Sweet Betsy from Pike, Sally Goodin', Sally Ann
- "Ghost Dance" Sonata No.7 (1987)
  1. Medicine Song (Apache)
  2. Song of the Fox (Cheyenne), Bird (Seminole), Song of the Fox Society (Lakota people)
  3. Ghost Dance (Pawnee), Ghost Dance (Arapaho), Song of the Earth Maker
  4. Love Song (Lakota people), Love Song (Wabanaki Confederacy), Love Song (Ho-Chunk)
- "Mountain" Sonata No.8 (1988, unfinished)
- "Washington Centennial" Sonata No. 9 (1989) based on Songs about Washington State; Commissioned by the Washington State Music Teachers Association for the Washington State Centennial Celebration of 1989.
  1. Western Washington - Welcome Song (Samish), Traveling Canoe Song (Samish), Song of Namu the Killer Whale (Gregory Short), The Old Settler, My Home In Cathlamet, Go Way Back and Sit Down, The Climb (quote: Symphony No. 2 "Mysterious Mountain" by Seattle resident Alan Hovhaness)
  2. Scherzo - Blackball Ferry Line Up In Seattle, San Juan Pig, Gooey Duck Song
  3. Eastern Washington - Our State of Washington, Walla Walla Is My Home Town, When Its Blossom Time In the Yakima Valley, Apple Picker's Reel, Roll On Columbia (quote: "Secrets" from Mountain Symphony No. 1 by Spokane resident Michael E. Young)
  4. Finale: The year 1889 represented in a rhythmic pattern - Welcome Song (reprise) (Sammish), Hail Washington, Shalom Aleichem (fugue), My Dreydl, Zero Dacus, Godzilla Ate Tukwilla, Washington My Home

== Sonatas in Tribute ==
- "Anwar Sadat" Sonata for Cello and Piano - Based on Egyptian Songs
  1. Pretty Little Dove, Village Song
  2. Camp David: What Wants This Lad (Egyptian), Let Us Be Friends Again (Israeli), Going to Georgia (American)
  3. Return, What Wants this Lad (reprise)
  4. Riesa Sadat's Lament, A Love Song, Wedding Processional
- "George Catlin" Sonata for Viola and Piano - Based on Native American Songs:
  1. Paddling Song (Lummi)
  2. Dance Song (Sioux), Quail Song (Cherokee)
  3. Hunting Song (Navajo), Buffalo Dance (Kiowa), Song of the Horse (Navajo), Antelope (Kiowa), Blue Bird (Pima), Song of the Hare (Ho-Chunk), Viola cadenza: Geronimo's Song (Apache)
  4. Ribbon Dance (Cayuga)
- "John F. Kennedy" Sonata for Violin and Piano:
  1. Camelot
  2. Elegy: The Riderless Horse
  3. Eternal Flame
- "Korean Air Flight 007" for Flute, Viola and Harp - Based on Korean Songs:
  1. Jinando Arirang
  2. Song of the Broad Bell Flower
  3. Song of the Birds
- "Martin Luther King Jr." Sonata for Piano Four Hands - Based on Spirituals
  1. In Bright Mansions Above, We Shall Overcome
  2. Wayfaring Stranger, Wondrous Love, O' Freedom, We Shall Overcome
  3. Great Day, Sit Down Servant, We Shall Overcome
- "Robert F. Kennedy" Sonata for Trumpet and Piano
  1. Slowly and majestically, fast and rhythmic - quotes the Shaker hymn “Simple Gifts," slowly
  2. Dirge
  3. Hymn: Confess Jehovah
  4. Finale ("Simple Gifts" reprise)

(For more sonatas, see Chamber Music)

== Songs and Song Cycles ==
- "Earth's Miracles" Cycle for Soprano and Piano
  1. A Spider's Web in the Sun (Azlyn Stanfield)
  2. Cricket (Raymond Jarvi)
  3. Night Crow (Theodore Roethke)
  4. The Cow - with a double udder (Theodore Roethke)
  5. The Eagle and the Mole (Eleanor Wylie)
  6. Earth's Miracles (Gwen Trastic)
- "Lines for Winter, Song for Soprano, French Horn and Piano (Mark Strand) poet
- “The Pilgrim” Cycle for Tenor, Piano and Percussion poetry by fifteenth-century Korean monk Kim Si-sŭp (trans. David Mesler)
  1. The Pilgrim's Way, Climbing the Mount of Saints, Wandering to Madness
  2. When One Gazes Into the Distance, Growing Old, To Whom Shall I Make Known?, Self Portrait
- “Silver Moon” Cycle of Seven Songs for Tenor and Piano
  1. Silent Moon (Walter De la Mare)
  2. The Donkey (G. K. Chesterton)
  3. Milk for the Cat (Harold Monro)
  4. The Wild Duck (John Mansfield)
  5. The Snare (James Stevens )
  6. The Birds (Hilaire Belloc)
  7. Silver Wind (Amy Lowell)
- “Summer Dawn” Cycle for Soprano and Piano based on Native American poetry
  1. Neither Spirit nor Bird (Shoshone: trans. Mary Austin)
  2. Calling One's Own (Ojibwa: trans. Charles Fenno Hoffman)
  3. The Wild Woman's Lullaby (trans. Constance Lindsay Skinner)
  4. Summer Dawn (trans. Constance Lindsay Skinner)

== Symphonies ==
- Symphony No. 1 for Large Orchestra (four movements played without pause, parts not written)
- Symphony No. 2 for Brass and Percussion
  1. Allegro drammattico
  2. Scherzo: Vivace
  3. Andante cantabile
  4. Allegro moderato - Allegro - Presto
- Symphony No. 3 for Symphonic Wind Ensemble
  1. Allegro energico
  2. Scherzo for jazz ensemble
  3. Molto adagio
  4. Finale: Variations
