= The Birdsongs =

American Christian rock band

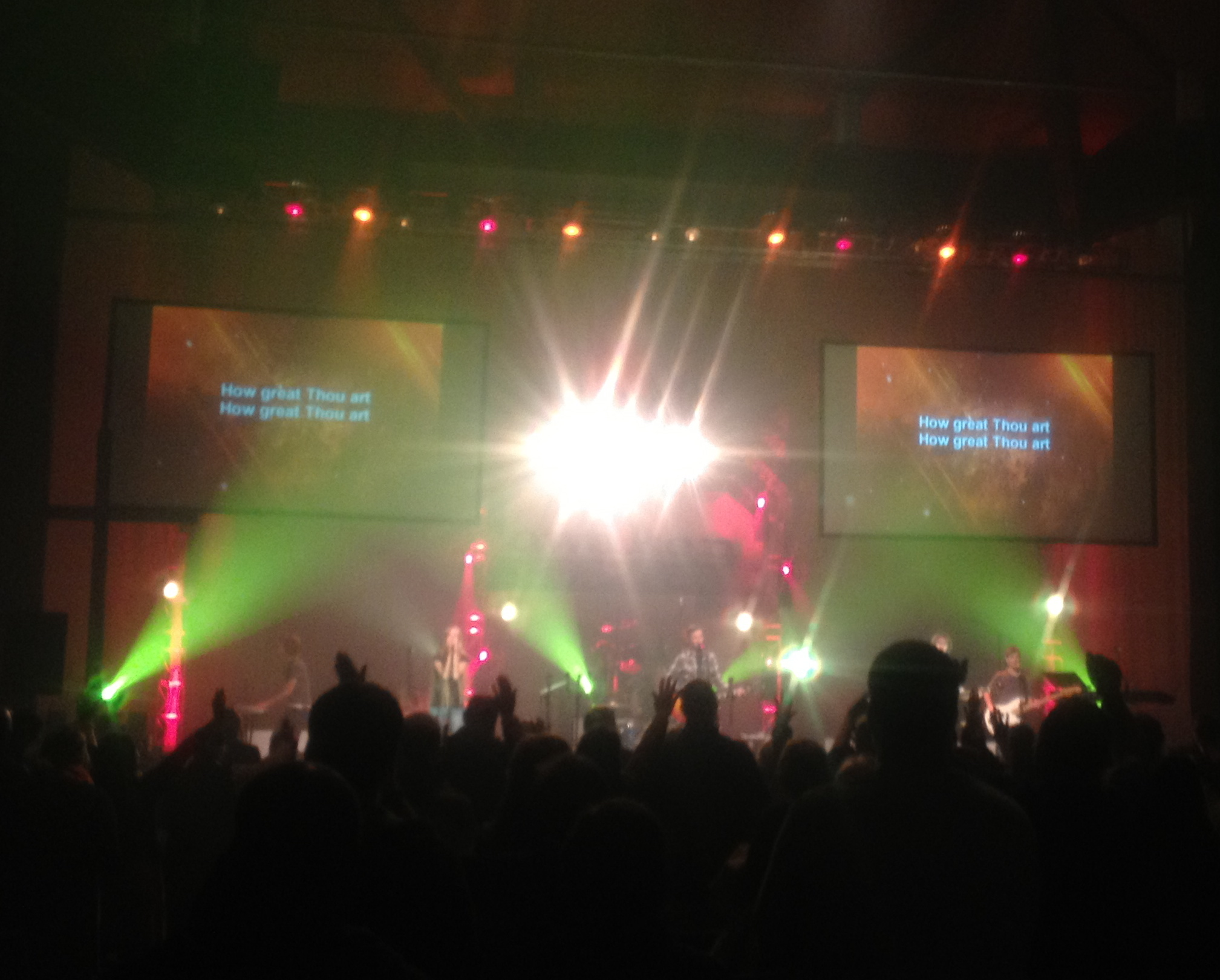
- The Birdsongs at Abba's House in Hixson, Tennessee, in December 2012

Background information
- Origin: Seattle, Washington
- Genres: Christian alternative rock, Christian rock, Power pop
- Label: Independent
- Members: Benjamin Birdsong; Coleene Birdsong; Timothy Birdsong; Philip Birdsong
- Past members: Matthew Birdsong; Wendell Birdsong
- Website: http://thebirdsongsmusic.com

The Birdsongs are an American Christian rock band originally from Seattle, Washington, now living near Knoxville, Tennessee, composed of three brothers and a sister, who began playing together as a family at a very young age. As a band, they have maintained a constant touring presence and have become increasingly popular at festivals, camps, youth events, and churches. In recent years, they have played shows with hit artists such as The Newsboys, Sanctus Real, RED, and Rush of Fools. Their single "Will You Save Me?" debuted on radio on July 23, 2012 with the album "The Journey: Act I; The Beginning" releasing shortly after in November 2012. "Will You Save Me" has since gathered over 1.5 million streams on Spotify. Their single "This Isn't Love" was released on February 14, 2014, and peaked at #9 on Billboard's National Christian Rock Airplay Chart. They released "The Journey: Act II; The War" on September 6, 2019.

== The Journey: Act I; The Beginning ==
The Birdsongs released the first EP in a two-part project entitled "The Journey: Act I; The Beginning" on November 20, 2012. They started work on the project with Grammy-nominated, Dove Award–winning producer Travis Wyrick (Pillar, Disciple, TobyMac, P.O.D.) who also produced their radio singles. The band finished the EP in Nashville with producer Geoff Hunker of the band Satellites & Sirens and producer/mixer Grant Craig who has worked with bands such as 12 Stones and Egypt Central. "The Journey: Act I; The Beginning" includes the popular radio single "Pieces (Hold On)" in addition to their singles "Will You Save Me?" and "This Isn't Love." This first EP is the first part of a two-part storyline. The story will culminate with an LP "The Journey: Act II; The War" being released on September 6, 2019.

== Singles ==
- "Pieces (Hold On)" - (#24 on Billboard BDS National Christian Rock Airplay Chart - March 2010, #27 on ChristianRock.Net's Top 100 of 2010, and #23 on their Top 100 Most Requested on 2010)
- "So Much More"
- "Will You Save Me?" - (#23 on Billboard BDS National Christian Rock Airplay Chart - September 2012, #1 on ChristianRock.Net's Top 30 - December 2012-January 2013)
- "This Isn't Love" - (#9 on Billboard BDS National Christian Rock Airplay Chart - May 2014, #1 on ChristianRock.Net's Top 30 - May 2014)
- "God Rest Ye Merry Gentleman" - (#3 on Christian Music Weekly - 2016)
- "Reality" - (#6 on Christian Music Weekly - 2020)
- “Keep On Fighting”

== Discography ==
=== Albums ===
- The Journey: Act I; The Beginning (2012, Independent)
- How Great Thou Art: Hymns II (2016, Independent)
- The Birdsongs' Tennessee Christmas (2017, Independent)
- The Journey: Act II; The War (2019, Independent)

=== EPs ===
- "Celestial Stationary EP" (2008, Independent)

== Members ==
Current

- Benjamin Birdsong - Lead Vocals, Guitar, Fiddle, Mandolin
- Coleene Birdsong - Backing Vocals, Bass, Guitar, Fiddle
- Timothy Birdsong - Keyboards, Backing Vocals, Guitar, Bass, Auxiliary Percussion
- Philip Birdsong - Drums, Backing Vocals, Guitar

Former

- Matthew Birdsong - Bass, Backing Vocals, Banjo, Fiddle
- Wendell Birdsong - Guitar, Backing Vocals
- Priscilla Birdsong
