= Mark Valenti =

American television writer

- Born: June 29, 1958 (age 68); United States
- Education: Strasberg Theatre Institute
- Occupation: Writer
- Spouse: Kristen
- Children: 2
- Writing career
- Pen name: Noah Zachary (LazyTown)
- Years active: 1985–present
- Notable works: Menno's Mind, Like Father, Like Santa, A Honeymoon to Remember, Deadly Debutantes, The Christmas Pageant, LazyTown
- Website: www.imdb.com/name/nm0884131

Mark Valenti is an Emmy-nominated American writer known for movies, TV series and novels.

== Career biography ==
Mark Valenti began his entertainment career as an actor with the St. Louis theatrical troupe the City Players. He moved to Los Angeles and studied at the Lee Strasberg Theatre Institute under Sally Kirkland and Marc Marno. Valenti appeared in several LA stage productions, and took roles on sitcoms and soap operas, including NBC's The Facts of Life.

In 1986, he became a production assistant for Steven Spielberg's Amblin Entertainment, reporting directly to producer Kathleen Kennedy. He then segued into a role as vice president of development for John Hughes. During Valenti's three-year tenure, Hughes produced ten films, including Home Alone, National Lampoon's Christmas Vacation, Planes, Trains and Automobiles, and Uncle Buck.

Having been intimately involved in Hughes' screenwriting process, Valenti left the executive ranks and began writing film scripts himself. His first produced movie, Menno's Mind, starring Billy Campbell and Robert Vaughn, was seen on the Showtime channel. The script was based on a short story he had written as a high school senior. This was followed by a flurry of screenplay spec sales to DreamWorks (Planet Fred), Nickelodeon Movies (Bob the House), ABC Family (Like Father, Like Santa), and Hallmark (The Christmas Pageant).

Valenti was creative manager for a team tasked with re-imagining Disney's California Adventure theme park in Anaheim. He also served as creative manager for Disney Interactive.

In 1999, Valenti was recruited as story editor at Nickelodeon Studios, working with the writing staff of shows like Rugrats, Hey Arnold!, CatDog, The Angry Beavers, and Rocket Power.

In 2000, Valenti was awarded a platinum record for writing the spoken-word portion of Mannheim Steamroller's The Christmas Angel, signifying over one million units sold.

By 2003, he became head writer for the Nickelodeon TV show LazyTown. Shot in Iceland on a sound stage in the middle of a lava field, it debuted as the #1 show for Nickelodeon, and went on to produce more than 75 episodes. Valenti also wrote and co-wrote lyrics for many of LazyTown's popular songs. For some of the episodes, Valenti was credited as "Noah Zachary", a name he used in honor of his two sons.

In 2022, Valenti was nominated for an Emmy award for STEM Explorers, a PBS show aimed at bringing science concepts to young viewers.

== Books ==
In 1995, Valenti published The Wonderful Wisdom of Oz - A Stupendous Compendium of Adages, Aphorisms and Axioms, a collection of curated quotes derived from the work of Oz author L. Frank Baum. His next book, The Hannibal Twist, featured a now-adult Tom Sawyer and Huck Finn in their continuing adventures. In 2004, he wrote Mannheim Steamroller's The Christmas Angel, a novelization of the NBC Christmas special of the same name. 2010 saw the publication of the coming-of-age dark comedy Last Night at the Monarch Motel, which was optioned by a film production company.

In 2018, Valenti wrote the YA novel trilogy The Wolf and the Warlander, published by Chip Davis' American Gramaphone.

2025 saw the publication of Dispatches From Kint, a collection of short stories based on the podcast of the same name. 2026, Valenti published the fictionalized memoir Half Moon Over Clark Street, a coming-of-age tale of a boy navigating unpredictable parents, and suburban dysfunction in mid-century St. Louis.

In 2026, Sticking Around - A Memoir was published. The book is a portrait of Mannheim Steamroller founder Chip Davis and his musical career. The book captures Davis' early days as the composer of the Fresh Aire series of albums, and his meteoric rise to fame as the innovator of Christmas music.

== Podcast ==
In 2025, Valenti wrote, produced and narrated Dispatches from Kint, a short-form fiction podcast presented as a series of fictional public announcements, reports, and broadcasts from the imaginary city of Kint. The podcast uses absurdist and surreal storytelling to explore everyday human themes such as love, work, loneliness, memory, and meaning. Episodes are typically brief and narrated in a restrained, official tone that contrasts with the often illogical or unsettling nature of the content.

== Charitable works ==
In 1992, Valenti and his wife Kristen created a fundraiser, Heart of the Matter, held at Pasadena's Ambassador Auditorium, for their friend Barbie York, then-wife of acclaimed classical guitarist Andrew York. Barbie had suffered a severe head injury in an automobile accident, sending her into a months-long coma. The concert they produced was a once-in-a-lifetime gathering of the classical guitar world's greatest players, among them Christopher Parkening, the LA Guitar Quartet, Liona Boyd and The Romeros. The concert netted $25,000 in one night.

In 2016, Valenti's friend and colleague Stefan Karl, who played the villain Robbie Rotten on LazyTown, was diagnosed with cholangiocarcinoma. Karl was forced to cancel all work-related activities during his treatment, so Valenti created a GoFundMe campaign which raised nearly $170,000. Valenti also engineered an AMA on Reddit, featuring Karl - with the help of his wife Steinunn Olina - which led to a live YouTube event that December. The video featured Karl and others singing "We Are Number One", the song (written by composer Mani Svavarsson) that had become a worldwide meme. The video has subsequently been seen millions of times, and Karl's YouTube channel has generated more than a million subscribers.

== Credits ==
Film	Year	Cast
Menno's Mind	1997	Billy Campbell, Bruce Campbell, Robert Vaughn, Corbin Bernsen
Like Father, Like Santa	1998	Harry Hamlin, Megan Gallagher, William Hootkins
The Christmas Angel	1999	Olivia Newton-John, Dorothy Hamill
The Christmas Pageant	2011	Melissa Gilbert, Robert Mailhouse, Edward Herrmann, Candice Azzara
My Wife's Secret Life	2019	Kate Villanova, Jason Cermak, Matthew MacCaull
Santa's Squad	2020	Aaron Ashmore, Rebecca Dalton, Michael Therriault
A Honeymoon to Remember	2021	Edward Ruttle, Rebecca Dalton, Brendan Taylor
Deadly Debutantes	2021	Angelina Boris, Revell Carpenter, Natalia de Mendoza
The Heiress of Christmas	2023	Katerina Maria Vitkoff

Series	Year	Episode
Back to the Future	1992	"St. Louis Blues"
Totally Spies!	2002	"The Soul Collector"
Rugrats	2003	"Gimme an A"
LazyTown	2004	75 episodes
Kid Fitness	2006	5 episodes
Olivia	2010	"Olivia Takes a Hike"
Gaspard & Lisa	2011	"The Magicians"
Julius Jr.	2014	"The Gummiest Bear"
STEM Explorers	2022	13 episodes

Award	Project	Year
Humanitas Prize	"Hand Me Downs" - Rugrats	1999
BAFTA	LazyTown	2006
Emmy nomination	STEM Explorers	2022

Book title	Year
The Wonderful Wisdom of Oz	1995
The Hannibal Twist	2013
The Wolf and the Warlander trilogy	2018
Life is Now (with Stefan Karl)	2020
Last Night at the Monarch Motel (with Sonia Silver)	2020
Mona My Love	2023
Dispatches From Kint	2025
Half Moon Over Clark Street	2026
Sticking Around - A Memoir	2026

== Professional affiliations ==
Valenti is a member of the Writers Guild of America and The Academy of Television Arts & Sciences.
