= Olivia (fictional pig) =

- Olivia the pig, as seen on the cover of the first book.
- First appearance: Olivia (2000)
- Created by: Ian Falconer
- Voiced by: Emily Gray & Jo Wyatt

In-universe information
- Species: Pig
- Gender: Female

Olivia is a fictional pig character in a series of children's picture books written and illustrated by the late Ian Falconer and named after and inspired by his niece. Falconer published his first entry of the franchise in 2000 and his last in 2017. The Olivia series is known for its use of humor, a distinct color palette of red, white, and black, and its inclusion of famous artwork. Critical reception frequently describes Olivia as a strong, creative, and spunky character. The Olivia series has expanded through various derivative works and collections. An animated television series, Olivia, inspired by the character premiered in 2009. Falconer's Olivia books have earned an array of awards and accolades, including a Caldecott Honor in 2001.

== Inspiration ==
The Olivia book series was conceived as a Christmas gift in 1996 for Falconer's then three-year-old niece, Olivia. In 2003, Falconer told USA Today that, like the character, his niece Olivia could talk her way through any obstacles when she had an objective in mind. Falconer has mentioned that other children would bring his niece the book to sign when she was younger. Additionally, he explained that he decided to make the protagonist a pig because piglets have heads that are disproportional to their bodies, which he thought would be appealing to young audiences. When commenting on his (at the time) twelve-year-old niece’s similarity to the Olivia character, Falconer said that his niece is more interested in sports than ballet or opera and claimed that most of the character design was inspired by himself. For example, in an interview, Falconer mentioned that he aspired to be an actor in high school but could not cope with stage-anxiety.

== Design and themes ==
Inspired by the style of Dr. Seuss, Falconer chose to draw images in black and white with the occasional splash of red, along with the insertion of real artwork by famous artists — Degas and Pollock, for example. In Olivia Forms a Band (2006) and Olivia…and the Missing Toy (2003), Falconer introduced the colors of blue and green, respectively. While originally adhering to the colors of red, black, and white, Falconer says he has started to add other colors to the original palette to distinguish the books from each other. Grown-up pop culture touches became a frequent pattern in Falconer’s Olivia books, with photographs of Eleanor Roosevelt and Martha Graham and references to Maria Callas and the ballet.

== Books ==
=== Written by Falconer ===
- Olivia (2000) – Olivia the pig lives with her family and enjoys many routines and hobbies. Olivia tries on all of her outfits before deciding what to wear. When it is sunny outside, Olivia goes to the beach, where she tans and makes sandcastles. When it is rainy, Olivia visits the museum—she even tries to recreate one of the paintings she sees there on the walls at home. When it is time for bed, Olivia and her mother negotiate over how many books to read–they settle on three.
- Olivia Saves the Circus (2001) – At school, Olivia retells her trip to the circus. All of the circus artists have fallen ill, leading Olivia to perform all of the acts herself, from walking on stilts to taming a lion.
- Olivia's Opposites (2002) – This board book explores opposites (such as “up” versus “down” or “plain” versus “fancy”).
- Olivia Counts (2002) – In this board book, Olivia counts from one to ten.
- Olivia...and the Missing Toy (2003) – While Olivia's mother sews her a new soccer jersey, Olivia realizes her best toy is missing from its place on the bed. After searching the house and questioning her brothers, Olivia has still not found the toy. Olivia eventually discovers that her dog Perry has chewed her toy to pieces.
- Teatro Olivia (2004) – A fold-out theater that comes with paper dolls of Olivia and her brother Ian. The playhouse contains materials, props, and scripts for staging productions of Swan Lake, Turandot, and Romeo and Juliet.
- Olivia Forms a Band (2006) – Olivia’s mom says there will be no band at their fireworks picnic. Olivia insists that there cannot be fireworks without a band and sets out to create a one-person band with household items and instruments.
- Olivia Helps with Christmas (2007) – Olivia attempts to help her family with preparations before Christmas (cutting off the top of the tree for a dinner table centerpiece and getting stuck in lights while untangling them). She tosses and turns in bed, hoping to catch a glimpse of Santa–she hears scratches on the roof, only to discover the source of the noise is a raccoon. Olivia and her family unwrap presents–ranging from sweaters to sleds to maracas–on Christmas morning.
- Olivia Goes to Venice (2010) – Olivia travels to Venice, where she rides a gondola, feeds pigeons corn in Piazza San Marco, and eats gelato. As her vacation comes to a close, Olivia tries to find the perfect souvenir.
- Olivia and the Fairy Princesses (2012) – Olivia has an identity crisis and realizes she does not want to be a pink fairy princess like all of the other pigs her age.
- Olivia the Spy (2017) – Olivia eavesdrops on her mother’s phone call, mistakenly believing that her mother plans to send her to an institution when she actually intends to bring her to the ballet.

=== Tie-ins to the Nickelodeon TV show (not written by Falconer) ===
- Olivia Acts Out (2009) – hardcover
- Dinner with Olivia (2009) – paperback
- Olivia Trains Her Cat (2009) – paperback (a Ready-To-Read book)
- Olivia Leaps! (2009) – board book
- This is Olivia (2009) – hardcover (a fold-out book)
- Olivia the Magnificent: A Life-the-Flap Story (2009) – paperback
- Meet Olivia (2009) – a coloring and activity book
- Brava Olivia (2009) – a coloring and activity book with stickers
- Olivia and Her Ducklings (2010) – paperback (a Ready-To-Read book)
- Olivia and the Babies (2010) – paperback
- Olivia Takes a Trip (2010) – paperback (a Ready-To-Read book)
- Olivia Opens a Lemonade Stand (2010) – paperback
- Olivia and the School Carnival (2010) – paperback
- Olivia and the Snowy Day (2010) – hardcover (a Ready-To-Read book)
- Olivia Cooks Up a Surprise (2011) – hardcover
- Olivia Plants a Garden (2011) – hardcover (a Ready-To-Read book)
- Olivia Leads a Parade (2011) – paperback
- Olivia Goes Camping (2011) – hardcover (a Ready-To-Read book)
- Olivia Becomes a Vet (2011) – hardcover (a Ready-To-Read book)
- Olivia and the Rain Dance (2012) – hardcover (a Ready-To-Read book)
- Olivia and the Kite Party (2012) – hardcover (a Ready-To-Read book)

== Reception ==
Reception of the Olivia series highlights its humorous tone and appeal to both youth and older audiences. However, reviews have argued that the Olivia books not authored by Falconer, such as those published by Nickelodeon, fail to replicate Falconer’s use of real art, black-and-white charcoal sketches, and witty prose. In an essay, scholar Mariko Turk argues that the Olivia series employs ballet to reimagine girlhood and empower women. Turk says that because Olivia wears serious expressions while practicing and imagining ballet, she deconstructs the association of ballet with frivolity. Writer Idra Novey, in The Washington Post, suggests that Falconer “granted Olivia a degree of idiosyncrasy often missing in picture books.” Novey also writes that Falconer's avoidance of unnecessary explanations in his writing serves to acknowledge how perceptive children can be.

== Awards ==
- Olivia (2000): a 2001 Caldecott Honor book, listed as one of the "Teachers' Top 100 Books for Children" by the National Education Association in 2007 and listed in the "Top 100 Picture Books" of all time in a 2012 poll by School Library Journal. Olivia (2000) was also the Parent's Choice 2000 Gold Award Winner and one of the ALA Notable Children's Books in 2001.
- Olivia Saves the Circus (2001) – the 2002 Booksense Illustrated Children's Book of the Year and Los Angeles Times Best Book of 2001.
- Olivia Helps with Christmas (2007) – Falconer won the 2008 Illustrator of the Year in the Children's Choice Book Awards for this title.

== In other adaptations ==
- In 2006, Olivia was one of eight characters to be featured by the United States Postal Service on first-class stamps as part of the "Favorite Children's Book Animals" issue.
- In 2008, Nickelodeon partnered with children's media company, Chorion, to bring the Olivia books to life in a new animated TV series. The new CGI series was produced by Academy Award nominated animation studio Brown Bag Films and launched on Nickelodeon on January 26, 2009.
- In 2011, Polin8 Media partnered with Chorion to create an interactive iPad application "Olivia Acts Out" available on the iTunes Store.

== See also ==
- Olivia (TV series)
- List of Olivia episodes
