= Olivia (TV series) =

Animated TV series or program

- The show's title card.
- Also known as: Olivia the Pig, Welcome to the World of the Pig Olivia
- Genre: Animated television series; Children's television series; Comedy
- Created by: Kate Boutilier; Patricia Resnick
- Based on: Olivia; Ian Falconer
- Developed by: Kate Boutilier; Eryk Casemiro
- Written by: Kate Boutilier; Silvia Cardenas Olivas; Eryk Casemiro; Ian Falconer; Michele Gendelman; Jill Gorey; Scott Gray; Barbara Herndon; Laurie Israel; Joan Considine Johnson; Tyler Lieberman; Chris Nee; Gabe Pulliam; Joseph Purdy; Patricia Resnick; Rachel Ruderman; Eric Shaw; Michael G. Stern; Mark Valenti; Ursula Ziegler-Sullivan
- Directed by: Darragh O'Connell; Timothy Björklund
- Voices of: Emily Gray; Michael Van Citters; Joyce Beverley; Danny Katiana; Jeremy Herzig; Brianna McCracken; Yvonne Craig; Robert Toonitititusa
- Composer: Darren Hendley
- Countries of origin: United Kingdom; United States; Ireland
- Original language: English
- No. of seasons: 2
- No. of episodes: 40 (list of episodes)

Production
- Executive producers: Patricia Resnick; Cathal Gaffney; Diana Manson; Kurt Mueller; Paula Rosenthal
- Producers: Gillian Higgins; Karen Ialacci
- Running time: 23 minutes
- Production companies: Chorion; Brown Bag Films

Original release
- Network: Nickelodeon and Nick Jr. Channel (US); Channel 5 (UK)
- Release: 26 January 2009 – 29 October 2015

Olivia is a children's computer-animated comedy television series produced by media company Chorion, in association with animation studio Brown Bag Films and Nickelodeon. The series based on the late Ian Falconer's series of books of the same name . The series won a silver Parents' Choice Award for its positive storylines and characters. The series premiered on January 26, 2009, on the Nick Jr. Channel and aired episodes through October 29, 2015. It had 40 episodes.

In 2012, Classic Media acquired the rights to the show from Chorion. Since then, Classic Media was sold to DreamWorks Animation and became DreamWorks Classics. In 2016, DreamWorks Animation became a subsidiary of NBCUniversal.

== Plot ==
Taking place in a world of anthropomorphic pigs, Olivia revolves around the title character and her family. The plots are mostly everyday situations in which Olivia finds herself and her unique way of dealing with them. In almost every episode from season 1, Olivia also dispenses her "Rules of Life". In each episode, Olivia dreams of having a job from the episode's experiences, such as being an artist after visiting the art gallery or being her mum's assistant after helping plan her friend's birthday party. Olivia sings the goodnight song at the end of each episode in season 2.

== Episodes ==
Season	Episodes	Originally released	
Season	Episodes	First released	Last released
1	25	January 26, 2009	April 29, 2010
2	15	November 21, 2010	October 29, 2015

== Characters ==
- Olivia (voiced by Emily Gray) is a young pig and the main character of the show. She is very imaginative and fantasizes about different roles, such as a pop star or superhero. She displays on setting up good examples and shows kids how to share with others, use their imaginations, be physically active, and be self-confident. She is in 1st grade.

=== Olivia's family ===
- Ian (voiced by Michael Van Citters) is Olivia's younger brother. He looks up to Olivia and enjoys being included in her activities but often becomes the typical annoying "little bother". He likes, among other things, dinosaurs, robots and baseball. In Season 2, he becomes less annoying, is more intelligent, on better terms with his sister, has a small planet on his T-shirt and a deeper voice.
- William (voiced by Robert Toonitititusa) is Olivia and Ian's youngest brother and typically sleeps, eats, and cries a lot.
- Mom, Olivia's mother (voiced by Joyce Beverley (Season 1) and Jennifer Reiter (Season 2)), who runs her own party-planning business from home.
- Dad, Olivia's father (voiced by Rick Zieff, credited under the pseudonym Danny Katiana) is an architect and occasionally absent-minded. He often provides his paternal wisdom to Olivia and her brothers in "little talks".
- Grandma (Olivia’s grandmother; voiced by Yvonne Craig), Olivia's maternal grandmother. She is very fun and adventurous. She is also a magician, as seen in "Olivia Makes Magic".
- Uncle Garrett (voiced by Connor Hall), Olivia's maternal uncle, is a professional football player and is a bit of a comedian. He performs ballet with Olivia and only appears in "Olivia Takes Ballet".
- Grandpa Cedric, Olivia's unseen maternal grandfather that Olivia mentions in "Olivia's Day at the Office".
- Perry and Edwin, Olivia's dog and cat. Perry is quite energetic and loves to play with the children, while Edwin is generally lethargic and prefers to sleep.
- Goldfish, a goldfish whose owner is Ian. It is rarely seen.
- Cedric, a one-time frog that Ian found and named after his Grandpa.

=== Friends ===
- Julian (voiced by Jeremy Herzig) is Olivia's male best friend. He is very smart with a self-deprecating sense of humor, but also very shy and lets Olivia take the lead. While often reluctant to go along with Olivia's ideas, he finally always does.
- Francine (voiced by Brianna McCracken (Season 1) and Cameron Escalante (Season 2)) is Olivia's female best friend. In the first season, she can be quite snobby, bossy, tries to make Olivia feel jealous and embarrassed at times, acts as Olivia's rival, and often serves as the antagonist. She acts more "girly" than Olivia and will not touch anything gross. Her birthday is eight months after Olivia's. In Season 2, Francine gets better and is more friendly to Olivia and her classmates.
- Gwendolyn is Francine's yellowish orange tabby. She is very talented and really likes Edwin. In one episode, Francine reveals that she sometimes dresses her in doll clothes to have a tea party and makes Gwendolyn fish sticks.
- Herman is Francine's dog. He makes his only appearance in "Olivia Trains Her Cat". He can ride a skateboard and also knows tricks like Gwendolyn.

=== School ===
- Mrs. Hogenmuller (voiced by Susan Balboni), Olivia's teacher, is a very dedicated educator, if a bit eccentric. She is an avid cat fancier and cowbell-playing virtuoso, with a penchant for the outdoors and a great enthusiasm for learning and life. She has 3 pets: two cats and a turkey.
- Alexandra (voiced by Zarii Arri) is a girl who often agrees with Francine.
- Sam (voiced by Katie Leigh), a classmate. He rarely talks. He has a pet opossum named Sally.
- Harold Hockenberry (voiced by Dayton Malone), a classmate. Harold is allergic to parsley, wears glasses, and his mom hates frogs. He can juggle but hiccups when nervous. He has a parrot that says things such as "Hi there" three times.
- Oscar and Otto (voiced by Hector and Juan Garcia (Season 1) and Max Wright (Season 2)), identical twin classmates whose recurring catchphrase is, "It's cool".
- Daisy (voiced by Katie Leigh), a small classmate who wears an all-purple-attire. In Season 1, she is a nice and friendly girl. In Season 2, she replaces Francine as a troublemaker and less friendly classmate.
- Connor (voiced by Alicyn Packard), a classmate who resembles Sam a lot, but talks more.
- Olivia 2 (voiced by Mary Smith), a character that made her only appearance in the episode "The Two Olivias". Olivia 2 was a new student in Olivia's class, much to the original Olivia's annoyance. They reconcile having the same name at the end of the episode. Olivia 2 was never seen in the episodes after it, presuming that her family moved out after a short time.
- Sophie, a girl who wears a yellow T-shirt and thin light purple jumper. In Season 1, she had no name, but in "Olivia's Tip-Top Tapper", the girl's name was revealed as Sophie. Like Sam, she rarely speaks.
- Caitlin (voiced by Alicyn Packard), who wears a blue shirt with white polka-dots. She rarely speaks, like Sam and Sophie.

== Shorts ==
The shorts are small, generally wordless segments in each episode (two per). They include the following:

William Eats (And Burps)

- William is hungry so Mum puts him in his highchair and goes to get him some applesauce. While she is gone, everyone else gives him tidbits of food. At the end, Mum says she thought he was hungry, but it appears William does not want his applesauce. She is surprised when he burps.

Olivia in the Bathroom

- While Dad is shaving, Olivia keeps taking her stool, getting up on it and doing something in front of the sink and mirror such as brushing her ears. At the end of the short she gets on her stool and kisses Dad.

Olivia and Her Toy

- Olivia tries to get her favourite doll to stand up straight, but it won't so she tapes it to the wall and the two have a tea party.

Olivia Scares Ian

- Olivia tries to scare her little 'bother' but she can't time it right. Later Ian scares her.

Olivia Builds a Tower

- Olivia is building a tower of random items. Ian, Perry, and William try to knock it down, but Mum and Dad forbid it. At the end, it's Olivia who purposely knocks it down.

Olivia Cheers Up William

- There are two versions of this short. In one (used during the first season), William is upset and Olivia tries to cheer him up. At the end (when Olivia is in her dairy cow costume), she hurts her leg by stepping on a block and cheers him up. The other (used during the second) is similar, except with Olivia laying Edwin beside William instead of hurting her foot.

Olivia's Bookbag

- Olivia is stuffing her bookbag for school with Perry and Ian taking her things then returning them each time she leaves the room. In the end, her bookbag becomes too heavy for her to carry and when she puts it on she falls over backwards.

William Goes for a Ride

- Olivia puts on her train driver hat and takes her family on a ride in her wagon. First it's just William, who is then joined by Perry, then Edwin, and finally Ian. The wagon gets heavier as each kid and pet climbs on board. At the end all the kids and pets are pulled in the wagon by Dad.

Ian Wants to Play

- Olivia and Julian are jumping rope and Ian wants to play, also. Throughout the entire short Ian is trying to get their attention but he is unsuccessful. Finally at the end he gets their attention and Olivia and Ian jump rope.

Olivia's Hidden Talent

- When Olivia sees a bowl of oranges she discovers she has a hidden talent for juggling. When she throws four oranges in the air they disappear. When she looks up, she realizes Ian who is standing on the stairs above her has caught them.

Olivia Slides

- Olivia and her toys slide many different ways in the park.

Perry Plays Fetch

- Olivia throws three different balls to Perry. The first two, a baseball and a soccer ball, he retrieves. The last, a beachball, he returns walking on. Olivia then throws a smaller baseball and he walks on the beachball to fetch the baseball.

Olivia's Trivia

- Olivia gets three pails and a ball which she puts under the red pail. She mixes them up and finally Perry guesses which pail the ball is under and gets the ball and Olivia chases Perry for the ball.

Olivia's Many Sandwiches

- Olivia makes herself a peanut butter sandwich and walks away. Ian takes it while she's gone and when she returns and finds it missing she blames it on Perry. After she leaves again Ian puts Olivia's favourite toy in a sandwich, returning and finding her toy in a sandwich and covered in peanut butter, Olivia realises it's Ian and chases him. The toy then falls to the floor and Perry licks it.

Olivia's Picture

- Olivia paints a picture of a pig with a blue background. The short ends showing the fridge filled with many copies of the same picture and Olivia replies "I think I'm done with my blue period", a reference to Pablo Picasso's blue period.

Edwin's Surprise

- Olivia is trying to draw a picture, but Edwin keeps laying on top of the picture resulting in Olivia moving him again and again. At the end the viewers see that the picture is of Edwin.

Olivia's Metamorphosis

- Olivia is about to go outside but Mum warns her it is about to get very cold. When Olivia opens the front door she imagines emperor penguins and snow. William flies away but Dad catches him. Olivia goes to her room and dresses for winter, but when she goes to the door again, it is hot outside. Olivia dresses like it is summer and Mum asks her why she keeps changing clothes. Olivia says it is the weather that's changing.

Olivia's Sculpture

- At the beach, Olivia finds a pile of sand and decides to make a sand sculpture of herself by shaping it and adding shells.

The Chase

- Olivia chases around Perry and Ian after they cause mischief for her. At the end Ian chases Perry.

Olivia's Magic Trick

- Olivia tries to make her cookie disappear but is unsuccessful. Later Perry eats it.

Olivia's Inflated Pirate Ship

- The mailman/postman brings a package for Olivia. He knocks on the door and walks away. Olivia opens the door and sees the package and opens it. When Olivia sees another box. She opens it and so on. 5 boxes are there and Olivia sees a purple flat cube. She pulls the string and it inflates into an inflated pirate ship. At the end, Olivia plays in the inflated pirate ship.

Olivia VS Ian

- On a stage, Olivia pulls out a trunk full of musical instruments. However, before she can even start playing music, Ian, who's been hiding behind the box suddenly swipes the instruments right out of her hands. First a violin, then a trumpet, and a guitar. Growing frustrated, Olivia has an idea and pulls out a pair of cymbals. When Ian tries his swiping technique again, Olivia crashes the cymbals together, scaring Ian. After laughing it off, both start playing music together.

Balloons

- At the kitchen table, Olivia helps her mom blowing up balloons for one of her client's parties. When she leaves to pick up a phone call, Olivia experiments with the balloon, twisting it into her signature "O" shape. Ian comes in, and tries to one-up Olivia's balloon by folding another in the shape of sword. Both then harmlessly contest each other, making more complicated balloon sculptures, Olivia following with a flower, Ian with a Dog, and then Olivia with a life-sized balloon of their Mom, who is amazed at by it when she comes back, much to Olivia and Ian's amusement.

== Broadcast ==
In addition to airing on Milkshake! and Nick Jr. in the UK and TG4 In Ireland, the series aired on the Nick Jr. Channel from 1 February 2009 until 30 October 2015 when Nickelodeon lost the rights to distribute the series. The show was subsequently broadcast on Universal Kids in the United States, Disney Junior in Latin America and Brazil, and Treehouse TV in Canada.

== See also ==
- Olivia (fictional pig)
