= Chorion Limited =

Media production company

- Final logo used from 2006 to 2012
- Formerly: Farthingway PLC (April–October 1995); Trocadero PLC (October 1995–April 1998); Chorion PLC (April 1995–May 2002); New Chorion PLC (February–May 2002); Chorion PLC (May 2002–2006)
- Type: Private
- Industry: Media; Television production; Distribution
- Founded: 7 April 1995; 31 years ago
- Defunct: March 2012; 14 years ago
- Fate: Split up, assets sold off
- Successor: Sony Pictures Television Kids
- Headquarters: London, United Kingdom; New York City, US; Sydney, Australia
- Products: Animation; Film production
- Number of employees: 150+
- Subsidiaries: Silver Lining Productions; Chorion Rights Limited; Chorion (IP) limited; Agatha Christie Limited
- Website: www.chorion.co.uk (archived 02/02/2011)

Chorion Limited was a multinational media production company with offices in London, New York, and Sydney. The company produced TV shows and feature films, and was best known for its portfolio of entertainment brands. These included children's characters such as Paddington Bear, Peter Rabbit, Mr. Men, The Very Hungry Caterpillar, Olivia, Gaspard and Lisa and Noddy. The company also owned the rights to the Agatha Christie Estate (including the Miss Marple and Poirot characters), Raymond Chandler, and Georges Simenon.

Chorion existed initially as a diversified entertainment company, with a portfolio of Intellectual Property (IP) rights, live entertainment venues and commercial real estate. From 2002 onwards, the business was refocused towards heritage IP Rights management and media production.

== History ==
=== 1995–1998: Beginnings ===
In 1994, the Burford Group purchased the London Trocadero entertainment complex in Piccadilly Circus, London for £94 million Nick Leslau and Nigel Wray, the operators of the complex, branched off on their own and separated the Trocadero's operations as a stand-alone company in 1995, called Trocadero PLC.

In January 1996, Trocadero PLC acquired Darrell Waters Ltd., the holding company for the estate of children's author Enid Blyton for £14.6 million. They soon formed a new subsidiary - Enid Blyton Ltd. to handle all intellectual properties, character brands, and media in Blyton's works. However, with this addition for the complex, along with a major tenant in the form of SegaWorld London, the company still failed to attract visitors. In 1997, John Conlan and Nick Tamblyn took over as the company's operators and re-structured Trocadero to focus on acquiring other intellectual properties and nightlife venues.

=== 1998–2002: Rebranding as Chorion ===
On 4 April 1998, Trocadero PLC was renamed as Chorion PLC, and under its new structure, both divisions of the company had expanded. The Bars & Nightclubs division acquired the London-based Oxygen, Zoo Bar/Venom, and Bar Madrid Nightclubs from Luminar PLC With their first nightclubs under their ownership, Chorion opened Tiger Tiger nightclub on London's Haymarket in late 1998. Tiger Tiger was the flagship of the company's nightclubs, with additional venues planned from 1999 onwards.

For Chorion's IP division, the company's first step into becoming the media production company it ultimately became came in June 1998, when Chorion acquired the rights to the Agatha Christie literary estate, with a vision of reviving the crime brand through new TV production and exporting the property to the United States, and soon afterward purchased the literary estate of Georges Simenon.

Despite the success of these nightclubs, it became increasingly clear that Chorion's business was made up of two very different divisions: a media production and rights ownership division, and an entertainment venue division. Analysts frequently cautioned that the company would not unlock its full value until these two businesses were demerged.

In February 2000, Chorion sold its ownership of the loss-making Trocadero Centre back to its previous owner, Burford Holdings. Later that year, in May 2000, the management announced during an Annual General Meeting their intention to demerge the nightclub and venue business from the media business.

In March 2001, the split of the entertainment division was delayed. By April 2001, Chorion's nightclub and venue division included nine London-based clubs, and three Tiger Tiger venues in London, Manchester and Birmingham, with additional branches in Portsmouth, Croydon and Leeds following on later in the year. and continued to purchase more venues.

=== 2002–2006: Split of Nightclub division, growth ===
On 17 May 2002, Chorion officially demerged its nightclub and venue division as a separately-operated public company named Urbium PLC. New Chorion PLC, which was formed to take over the IP division, effectively became the new Chorion PLC and was renamed as such within the same month. With the company focused solely on media production, Chorion began a period of expansion driven by the acquisition of new literary properties and the development of new TV and film properties to unlock their value. The first steps in this new direction included a series of management changes that placed experienced executives from the world of television at the helm of the company. At the end of the month, the company purchased the literacy estate of Nicolas Freeling.

On 4 December 2002, Chief Executive Nick Tamblyn announced his immediate resignation. Waheed Alli joined the company as a Non-Executive Deputy Chairman. Just a few months later, in April 2003, he stepped up to the position of chairman. The company put up its children's assets for sale in November 2002 but ultimately decided to keep them.

During this period, Chorion produced various new TV productions. In May 2002, the UK's Channel Five announced that it had commissioned 100 episodes of a new animated television series based on Enid Blyton's Noddy, with the show Make Way For Noddy having its premiere airing in September of that year. In November 2002, the company announced a four-year deal with major UK television network ITV to produce a few feature-length TV dramas based on the Agatha Christie novels. These began to broadcast on-air at the end of 2003. During this period, development and production also began on an animated TV series based on The Famous Five in collaboration with Disney Channel in France. The range of newly developed TV shows began to expand internationally, with Noddy becoming the most recognised children's character in France in 2003 and sold to the Chinese market in 2004, and airing in the US on PBS Kids in 2005.

As well as the commission and launch of various new TV productions, the period immediately following Waheed Alli's elevation to the Chairmanship was marked by a series of high-profile acquisitions of new properties. In April 2004, after several months of negotiations, Chorion acquired the distribution rights to the Roger Hargreaves Mr. Men series for £28 million. This acquisition was followed up in May 2005 with total ownership of the Hargreaves estate and the rights to produce new TV series.

In July 2005, Chorion made a major step towards becoming an international business when it bought UK-based Silver Lining Productions. Along with an office in New York City, this acquisition gave Chorion ownership of the media and merchandise rights to The Very Hungry Caterpillar by Eric Carle, Olivia by Ian Falconer, and Max & Ruby and Timothy Goes To School, both by Rosemary Wells.

=== 2006–2011: Take-private and international expansion ===
In early 2006, Alli led a management buyout of the company backed by private equity firm 3i Group Plc. In May 2006, this process was completed when Chorion delisted from the AIM exchange to become a private limited company.

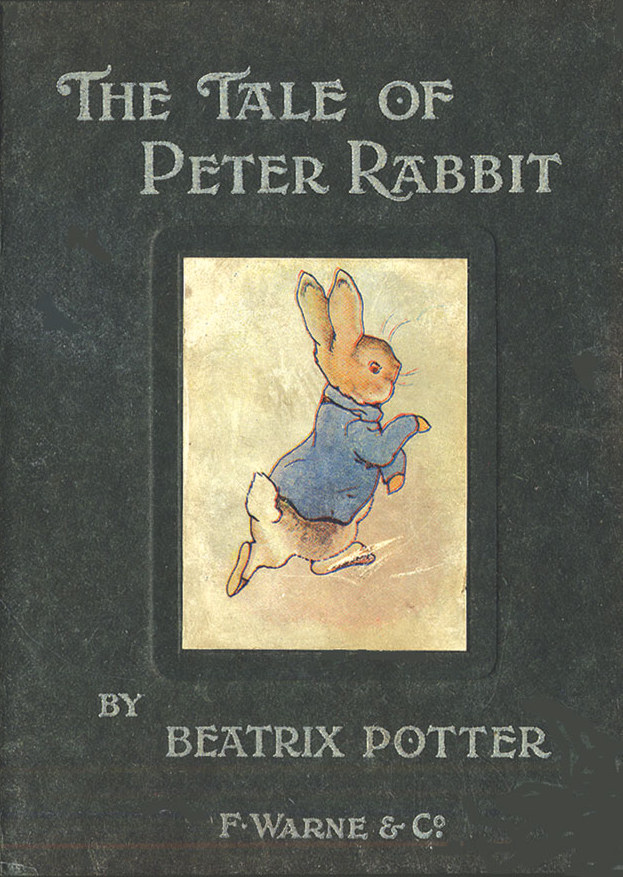
Peter Rabbit, (1901). Chorion developed a TV series based on the book, in collaboration with Nickelodeon in the US

Waheed Alli was chief executive officer and executive chairman, and pursued a strategy of developing and launching one new children's property every year. This development strategy included the launch of a new series of Noddy in 2007, an animated version of the Mr. Men in 2008, the US launch of Olivia in 2009, the British launch of The Octonauts in 2010, Gaspard and Lisa in 2011 and a new animated version of Beatrix Potter's Peter Rabbit in 2012. This production was a joint venture with US broadcaster Nickelodeon and British publisher Frederick Warne & Co, part of the Penguin Group.

The launch of The Octonauts represented a big hit for the company, achieving on-air ratings for the show as number one in the key demographic of boys aged 4 to 6. Chorion announced in 2010 that they had signed international toy makers Fisher Price as the master toy partner for the brand, with a full toy line launching in the UK in August 2011.

The development of a new animated series of Peter Rabbit was made possible by Chorion's acquisition in November 2007 of the Copyrights Group, a competing intellectual property management company who managed the licensing and merchandising rights to the Beatrix Potter characters, owned by Frederick Warne, part of the Penguin Group. The company also owned the rights to Paddington Bear and the Flower Fairies, and managed Spot the Dog by Eric Hill, The Snowman by Raymond Briggs, and the Horrible Histories book series by Terry Deary.

=== 2011–2012: Sale of assets ===
On 24 August 2011, chairman and CEO Waheed Alli along with deputy chairman William Astor announced to the company that they would be resigning their positions following the failure of the company's lenders to reach an agreement to restructure Chorion's debt burdens. Shortly thereafter, private equity owners 3i began a process to sell Chorion's assets:

- 22 September 2011 - The Octonauts franchise and the estate of Beatrix Potter were purchased by Waheed Alli, under his new children's entertainment company Silvergate Media, which he founded after leaving Chorion.
- October 2011 - Nicholas Durbridge and Linda Pooley re-acquired The Copyrights Group. The company was ultimately acquired by StudioCanal in June 2016.
- 6 December 2011 - Japanese toy and licensing design company Sanrio purchased THOIP and Mister Men Limited, the holding companies for the Mr. Men and Little Miss franchise as well as its associated merchandise business, and placed them under a new UK-based subsidiary - Sanrio Global Limited.
- 29 February 2012 - Acorn Media Group purchased Agatha Christie Limited, the holding company for the Agatha Christie estate.
- 7 March 2012 - Classic Media purchased the Noddy property. Later on in the year, DreamWorks Animation would purchase Classic Media, who ultimately were purchased by NBCUniversal in 2016.
- 15 March 2012 - The Rights House and PFD purchased the estates of Dennis Wheatley, Margery Allingham, Nicolas Freeling and Edmund Crispin.
- 19 March 2012 - A week after purchasing Noddy, Classic Media announced they had also purchased the Olivia property.
- 26 March 2012 - Hachette UK purchased the rest of the Enid Blyton estate.
- 30 March 2012 - Canadian animation studio Nelvana (who already produced the respective television series of the same name) purchased a stake in the Max & Ruby franchise (with Rosemary Wells retaining the other half), including worldwide licensing rights.
- 19 April 2012 - Sony Creative Products Inc., a subsidiary of Sony Music Entertainment Japan, purchased the Gaspard and Lisa property.

== List of unlicensed productions ==
=== Children's estate ===
- Spot the Dog
- The World of Eric Carle including The Very Hungry Caterpillar
- Maisy
- The Story of Tracy Beaker
- The Snowman
- Horrible Histories
- Flower Fairies

=== Literary estates ===
- The Works of Raymond Chandler including Philip Marlowe
- The Works of Georges Simenon including Inspector Maigret

== List of former productions ==
=== Children's estate ===
- Peter Rabbit and The World of Beatrix Potter (sold to Silvergate Media, now Sony Pictures Television Kids)
- Paddington Bear (now owned by StudioCanal)
- Mr. Men and Little Miss (sold to Sanrio)
- Gaspard and Lisa (Sold to Sony Creative Products)
- Octonauts (sold to Silvergate Media, now Sony Pictures Television Kids)
- Olivia (Sold to Classic Media (Later acquired by DreamWorks Animation and NBCUniversal)
- The Works of Enid Blyton
  - Noddy (Sold to Classic Media (Later owned by DreamWorks Animation and NBCUniversal)
  - Malory Towers (sold to Hachette UK)
  - The Famous Five (sold to Hachette UK)
  - The Secret Seven (sold to Hachette UK)
  - Five Find-Outers (sold to Hachette UK)
- The Works of Rosemary Wells (sold to Nelvana)
  - Max & Ruby
  - Timothy Goes to School

=== Literary estates ===
- The Works of Agatha Christie including Poirot and Miss Marple (sold to Acorn Media Group)
- The Works of Margery Allingham (sold to The Rights House and PFD)
- The Works of Edmund Crispin (sold to The Rights House and PFD)
- The Works of Nicolas Freeling (sold to The Rights House and PFD)
- The Works of Dennis Wheatley (sold to The Rights House and PFD)
