= The Christmas Angel: A Family Story =

Christmas Angel: A Family Story

Studio album by Mannheim Steamroller
- Released: October 6, 1998
- Recorded: 1981, 1984, 1988, 1995, 1997, 1998
- Genre: Christmas, symphonic pop
- Length: 45:41
- Label: American Gramaphone
- Producer: Chip Davis

Mannheim Steamroller chronology
Mannheim Steamroller Christmas Live (1997)	Christmas Angel: A Family Story (1998)	Renaissance Holiday (1998)

Mannheim Steamroller Christmas albums chronology
Mannheim Steamroller Christmas Live (1997)	The Christmas Angel: A Family Story (1998)	Renaissance Holiday (1998)

Professional ratings
Review scores
Source	Rating
AllMusic	link

The Christmas Angel: A Family Story is a 1998 Christmas album by the band Mannheim Steamroller, their fifth Christmas album. The soundtrack, accompanied by the narration of Chip Davis and Olivia Newton-John, tells the story of a decorative angel that is stolen from the top of a Christmas tree by a villain called the Gargon. The toys under the tree will not become presents until the angel is found. With the toys' help, a young mother defeats the Gargon and Christmas is saved.

The story was then turned into a figure skating production titled The Christmas Angel: A Story on Ice, starring Dorothy Hamill as the mother, Elvis Stojko as the Gargon, and Tonia Kwiatkowski in the title role of the Angel.

== Track listing ==
No.	Title	Narrated By	Length
1.	"Introduction"	Olivia Newton-John	0:58
2.	"Joy to the World"		3:38
3.	"Stille Nacht (Silent Night)"	Chip Davis	5:26
4.	"The Dream"	Olivia Newton-John	3:22
5.	"Crystal"	Chip Davis	4:21
6.	"Carol of the Bells"	Olivia Newton-John	3:49
7.	"Messengers of Christmas"	Chip Davis and Olivia Newton-John	3:33
8.	"Greensleeves"	Chip Davis	3:27
9.	"Above the Northern Lights"	Olivia Newton-John	5:04
10.	"Good King Wenceslas"	Chip Davis	3:24
11.	"Deck The Halls"	Olivia Newton-John	3:56
12.	"Angels We Have Heard on High"	Olivia Newton-John	4:30
Total length:			45:41

== Personnel ==
- Chip Davis - arranged by, producer, narrator
- Olivia Newton-John - narrator
- Mark Valenti - writer
- Gregory Manchess - artwork
- Dan Charette - engineer, analog to digital transfer, restoration
- Dave Cwirko - engineer analog to digital transfer, restoration
- Brian Ackley - remix, mastered by
