= Renaissance Holiday =

Studio album by Mannheim Steamroller
- Released: October 13, 1998
- Genre: Christmas
- Length: 55:16
- Label: American Gramaphone
- Producer: Chip Davis

Mannheim Steamroller chronology
The Christmas Angel: A Family Story (1998)	Renaissance Holiday (1998)	Mannheim Steamroller Meets the Mouse (1999)

Mannheim Steamroller Christmas albums chronology
The Christmas Angel: A Family Story (1998)	Renaissance Holiday (1998)	Christmas Extraordinaire (2001)

Professional ratings
Review scores
Source	Rating
AllMusic	4/5 stars

Renaissance Holiday is a studio album by the symphonic pop band Mannheim Steamroller featuring the London Symphony Orchestra. It was released on October 13, 1998, one week after The Christmas Angel: A Family Story (October 6 ). They were later released as a two CD set.

== Track listing ==
No.	Title	Length
1.	"Volte" (feat. Pittsburgh Symphony Brass)	2:22
2.	"Ding Dong! Merrily On High"	1:33
3.	"Cos Colo Odo Sa"	1:19
4.	"Ballet"	1:24
5.	"I Saw Three Ships"	1:26
6.	"The King's Mistress"	1:06
7.	"In Dulci Jubilo"	4:47
8.	"En Avois/Tant Que Vivray"	1:47
9.	"Gigue"	2:08
10.	"Malle Sijmon"	2:21
11.	"Intrada"	1:53
12.	"Greensleeves"	2:46
13.	"Laura Suave"	4:46
14.	"Joseph Dearest, Joseph Mine"	1:42
15.	"Coventry Carol"	1:46
16.	"Wolseys Wilde"	1:37
17.	"New Yeeres Gift"	1:19
18.	"The Nymph's Dance/The Second Of Grays Inn"	3:02
19.	"There Is No Rose of Such Virtue"	1:18
20.	"Lachrimae Antiquae"	2:51
21.	"Patapan/God Rest Ye Merry Gentlemen"	1:39
22.	"Gagliarda"	1:18
23.	"Bouree"	1:39
24.	"Lo, How A Rose E'er Blooming" (feat. Pittsburgh Symphony Brass)	1:56
25.	"Bateman's Masque"	2:18
26.	"M. George Whitehead and His Almand"	1:45
27.	"The Merry Bells of Speyer" (feat. Pittsburgh Symphony Brass)	1:22
Total length:		55:16
