= Christmas Live =

Mannheim Steamroller Christmas Live

Live album by Mannheim Steamroller
- Released: October 14, 1997
- Recorded: January 3 & 4, 1996
- Venue: Orpheum Theatre (Omaha), Omaha, Nebraska
- Genre: Christmas, symphonic pop
- Length: 53:53
- Label: American Gramaphone
- Producer: Chip Davis

Mannheim Steamroller chronology
Huskers Muzik (1995)	Mannheim Steamroller Christmas Live (1997)	The Christmas Angel: A Family Story (1998)

Mannheim Steamroller Christmas albums chronology
Christmas in the Aire (1995)	Mannheim Steamroller Christmas Live (1997)	The Christmas Angel: A Family Story (1998)

Professional ratings
Review scores
Source	Rating
Allmusic	4.5/5 stars

Mannheim Steamroller Christmas Live is Mannheim Steamroller's fourth Christmas album overall and was first released in time for the 1997 holiday season (October 14). It is a recorded live performance which includes variations on the arranged tracks featured in previous Steamroller albums.

A companion DVD of the concert was also released. The light show consisted of a semi-transparent screen positioned in front of the musicians (as opposed to being in the back like most concerts) where various images would be projected to give a three dimensional look.

== Track listing ==
No.	Title	Length
1.	"Angels We Have Heard on High"	4:03
2.	"Chip's Intro"	2:03
3.	"Christmas Lullaby"	4:10
4.	"Pat-a-Pan"	5:09
5.	"Rudolph the Red-Nosed Reindeer"	3:09
6.	"Los Peces en el Rio"	3:52
7.	"Joy to the World"	3:46
8.	"Gagliarda"	3:17
9.	"In Dulci Jubilo"	2:58
10.	"Wassail, Wassail"	2:35
11.	"Carol of the Birds"	2:12
12.	"I Saw Three Ships"	1:33
13.	"God Rest Ye, Merry Gentlemen (Traditional)"	1:55
14.	"God Rest Ye Merry, Gentlemen (Rock Version)"	4:29
15.	"Stille Nacht"	5:26
16.	"Going to Another Place"	3:16
Total length:		53:53

== Personnel ==
- Chip Davis: Drums, Recorders, Percussion, Toys
- Almeda Berkey: Harpsichord, Keyboards
- Jackson Berkey: Piano, Harpsichord, Keyboards
- Ron Cooley: Guitar, Fretted Instruments
- Robert Jenkins: Oboe
- Janet Wesley Kelly: Harp
- Roxanne Layton: Recorders, Percussion
- Laurence Lowe: French Horn
- Chuck Penington: Conductor
- Arnie Roth: Concertmaster, Violin
- Violins: Christopher Hake, Karen Martin, Keith Plenert, Kimberly Salistean, Arnold Schatz, Scott Shoemaker
- Violas: Judy Divis, Sarah Richardson
- Cellos: Gregory Clinton, Holly Stout
- Trumpet: Eric Hansen, George Vosburgh
