= Like Father, Like Santa =

1998 film by Michael Scott

Like Father, Like Santa (also known as The Christmas Takeover) is a TV movie starring Harry Hamlin and William Hootkins. It premiered on Fox Family in 1998 on their 25 Days of Christmas programming block. The script was written by Mark Valenti.

== Plot ==
The story revolves around a toy tycoon named Tyler Madison (Harry Hamlin) who is greedy, ruthless, and neglectful of his family. He wants a monopoly of the toys industry and is determined to erase all his competitors including his father Santa Claus. Tyler had a bitter childhood which motivates him to put Santa Claus out of business. He travels to the North Pole to take over Santa's toy workshop. However, he realizes that he has a lot in common with his father and soon faces a crisis of conscience when the Christmas elves at his father's mailroom begin a Coup d'état.

== Cast ==
- Harry Hamlin as Tyler Madison
- Megan Gallagher as Elise Madison
- Curtis Blanck as Danny Madison
- William Hootkins as Santa Claus
- Gary Coleman as Ignatius
- Michael Munoz as Whoops
- Roy Dotrice as Ambrose Booth
- Gary Frank as Smitty
- Stuart Pankin as Snipes

== See also ==
- List of Christmas films
- Santa Claus in film
