= Menno's Mind =

- Directed by: Jon Kroll
- Written by: Mark Valenti
- Produced by: Larry Estes
- Starring: Billy Campbell; Stephanie Romanov; Corbin Bernsen; Michael Dorn; Bruce Campbell
- Cinematography: Gary Tieche
- Edited by: Stephen R. Myers
- Music by: Christopher Franke
- Distributed by: Showtime Networks
- Release date: December 13, 1997
- Running time: 95 minutes
- Country: United States
- Language: English

Menno's Mind is a 1997 film directed by Jon Kroll for Showtime. The film stars Billy Campbell, Stephanie Romanov, Corbin Bernsen, and Michael Dorn. The screenplay was written by Mark Valenti.

== Plot synopsis ==
Campbell plays the titular Menno, a computer programmer at a virtual reality resort that allows visitors to escape into simulations of their fantasies. The technology is being employed for election fraud by the chief of security, Felix Medina. The resistance leader recruits Menno to fight the corruption.

== Cast ==
- Billy Campbell as Menno
- Stephanie Romanov as Loria
- Corbin Bernsen as Felix Medina
- Michael Dorn as Simon, Menno's Friend
- Bruce Campbell as Mick Dourif, Rebel Leader
- Robert Picardo as Senator Taylor
- Marc McClure as Bennett, Medina's Gofer
