= List of Olivia episodes =

This is the following episode list for Nick Jr.'s Olivia. The series ran for two seasons between 2009 and 2015.

== Series overview ==
Season	Episodes	Originally released	
Season	Episodes	First released	Last released
1	25	January 26, 2009	April 29, 2010
2	15	November 21, 2010	October 29, 2015

== Episodes ==
=== Season 1 (2009–2010) ===
No. overall	No. in season	Title	Written by	Original release date	Prod. code
1	1	"Olivia Measures Up Olivia Plays Hotel"	Patricia Resnick Kate Boutilier & Eryk Casemiro	January 26, 2009	101
Olivia tries to stop her brother from growing, but her plan fails horribly. Olivia transforms her house into a make believe hotel when her friends are attending a sleepover, and looks for a ghost who is scaring the guests, who actually turns out to be her very annoying little brother, Ian.: Note: "Olivia Plays Hotel" is the (pilot) episode.; Rules of Life: #47: School glue has many uses. #42: If it weren't for mothers, little brothers would be very stinky.
2	2	"Olivia's Ice Spectacular Olivia's Snow Day"	Kate Boutilier & Eryk Casemiro	January 27, 2009	102
Olivia and her friends stage their own ice skating show after "Cinderella on Ice" is canceled due to the fact that the star of the ice show Sonja Spencer is sick. Olivia reports on all the snow day happenings.: Note: In "Olivia's Snow Day", Olivia doesn't say a Rule of Life.; Rules of Life: #48: When you really, really, really want something, it helps to use a triple please.
3	3	"Olivia Makes Magic Olivia and the School Concert"	Patricia Resnick Joe Purdy	January 28, 2009	103
Olivia practices magic tricks and made herself disappear, her little brother and friend, Julian, look for her. Olivia helps Julian overcome his stage fright during a school musical about fruits and vegetables.: Rules of Life: #312: Even a plain old peanut butter and jelly sandwich tastes special when you pull a really good trick on your little brother. #114: Be nice to your toys and stuffed animals because one day they may end up helping your best friend.
4	4	"Olivia Visits the Aquarium Olivia Goes International"	Eryk Casemiro & Kate Boutilier Joan Considine Johnson	January 29, 2009	104
Olivia and her classmates compete on a class trip to the aquarium. Olivia decides to invent her own country, and keeps changing her costume.: Rules of Life: #12: Sometimes other peoples' idea of fun is very different from your own. #7: Whatever the question, costumes are always a good answer.
5	5	"Olivia and the Crystal Ball Olivia Plays Soccer"	Jill Gorey & Barbara Herndon Patricia Resnick	January 30, 2009	105
Olivia mistakenly believes that the police have come to take William to jail after she and Ian accidentally breaks their father's bowling trophy and wants the police to arrest her instead. Olivia is very disappointed when Francine gets picked to play as the goalie on their soccer team, but Francine’s not as good at being a goalie as she should be.: Rules of Life: #4: If you really want to hide your baby brother, change his diaper first. #5: Not everyone can wear red, especially when you're pink.
6	6	"The Two Olivias Olivia Tends to the Sick"	Patricia Resnick Eryk Casemiro & Kate Boutilier	February 9, 2009	106
When another girl named Olivia joins her class, and the students become more involved with her than Olivia, she changes her name to Pam. Later, Pam becomes friends with Olivia. Olivia pretends that she is a doctor who runs an itchy-foot clinic to help Julian before a big soccer game.: Rules of Life: #28: I know this is hard to believe, but more of something isn't always better. #38: Just because a dog looks cute in a nurse's hat, doesn't mean he's a very good nurse.
7	7	"Olivia Makes a Video Olivia Takes a Road Trip"	Joan Considine Johnson Eric Shaw	February 10, 2009	107
Olivia creates a video diary by filming her family and classmates for her dad since he's out of town. Olivia is quite miserable when her family's flight to Grandma's is canceled, so she finds ways to pass the time while on a long drive there.: Note: In Olivia Takes a Road Trip, Olivia doesn't say a Rule of Life.; Note: In one episode it is one of the very few times Olivia says a Rule of Life in her imagination. Others are Olivia and Grandma's Visit and The Two Olivias.; Rules of Life: #53: When playing a cowbell, never underestimate the importance of enthusiasm.
8	8	"Olivia Goes Camping Olivia Becomes a Vet"	Patricia Resnick	February 11, 2009	108
Olivia attempts to transform Francine into an expert camper, with very little success. Olivia is inspired to become a veterinarian and helps a tiger with missing stripes.: Note: In one episode, it is the very few times Olivia says a Rule of Life with a number that has already been used. Others are Olivia Makes a Wedding Gift and Olivia Keeps a Secret.; Rules of Life: #47: Walking up things is harder than walking down them, but the view is beautiful. #31: Most people think animals don't talk, but they do. They just talk very quietly.
9	9	"Olivia Packs Up Olivia is Invited to Dinner"	Patricia Resnick Eryk Casemiro & Kate Boutilier	February 12, 2009	109
Olivia searches for a place that is free from her little brothers. Francine invites Olivia to her house for dinner.: Rules of Life: #27: One good thing about little brothers: sometimes they get how funny you are. #3: If you have to sit next to a little brother eating spaghetti, you better wear a raincoat.; Trivia: It is revealed before this episode that Edwin took Ian's goldfish and William almost ate it, meaning William might have teeth and Edwin likes fish and moves a lot once in a while. Also, in "Olivia is Invited to Dinner", they have Brussels sprouts at Francine's house, and Olivia quite gagged, so she's implying to the viewers that she strongly dislikes Brussels sprouts.
10	10	"Olivia the Pet Monitor Olivia and the Anniversary Surprise"	Patricia Resnick Kate Boutilier & Eryk Casemiro	February 13, 2009	110
Olivia and Francine both want to be the classroom pet monitor. Olivia wants to surprise her parents on their anniversary.: Note: "Olivia and the Anniversary Surprise" is the Valentine's Day special (which aired as part of the Hearts and Hugs Playdate), and Olivia doesn't say a Rule of Life.; Rules of Life: #55: If your teacher says no to a sea lion or an elephant, a tiger is probably out of the question.
11	11	"Olivia Paints a Mural Olivia's Day at the Office"	Patricia Resnick Kate Boutilier & Eryk Casemiro	February 27, 2009	111
Olivia is inspired to become a painter after a trip to the museum, and makes a really big mess in her room. Olivia and Ian's father brings them to work with him on Take Your Kids to Work Day. Ian's pet frog comes with them.: Rules of Life: #74: A crying baby is not always bad thing. #41: What is the point of bringing kids to work if they can't help?
12	12	"Olivia Leads a Parade Olivia the Nature Photographer"	Patricia Resnick Eryk Casemiro & Kate Boutilier	March 23, 2009	112
Olivia, Ian and Julian create their own backyard parade. Olivia and Julian camp out in the backyard to photograph wild animals, but her annoying little brother scares one away.: Rules of Life: #14: If you wake your baby brother up from a nap, sometimes he will get upset. And sometimes, your mother will, too. #30: Just because your little brother eats like a wild animal, doesn't mean he is one.
13	13	"Olivia Explores Outer Space Olivia Becomes a Chef"	Jill Gorey & Barbara Herndon Patricia Resnick	March 24, 2009	113
Olivia creates a model of the entire Solar System for a school project. Olivia, Ian and their father cook a special meal for their mother's birthday.: Rules of Life: #68: If you build a really big solar system, make sure you have a really big bedroom door. #100: Red is the very best color for absolutely, positively everything.
14	14	"Olivia Plays Piano Olivia Trains Her Cat"	Patricia Resnick Joe Purdy	March 25, 2009	114
Olivia thinks Ian is the best piano player than her. Olivia searches for her missing lazy cat, Edwin.: Rules of Life: #52: If your mom is having a baby and she asks you whether you want a brother or sister, that does not mean you are really going to get the kind you ask for. #24: If you have a pet that does not move, watch out, because one day it will.
15	15	"Olivia and Her Ducklings Olivia Takes Ballet"	Kate Boutilier & Eryk Casemiro Patricia Resnick	March 26, 2009	115
Olivia and Ian try to keep a family of ducks a secret from their mother and father. Olivia recruits Uncle Garret as a ballet partner.: Rules of Life: #147: Most of the time, little brothers ask silly questions, but sometimes they ask really good ones. #110: It is important to use fancy French words when you talk about ballet.
16	16	"Olivia Gets Fit Olivia Helps Mother Nature"	Patricia Resnick	April 22, 2009	116
Olivia puts herself and Julian on a training regimen as they prepare for their school's track-and-field day. The day finally starts, but soon it starts to rain. Olivia makes it her mission to recycle and conserve energy.: Rules of Life: #65: For some reason, headbands make you feel faster. #44: Sometimes children know better than their parents, but we do not ever tell them that.
17	17	"Olivia and the Babies Olivia's Good Luck"	Patricia Resnick Eryk Casemiro & Kate Boutilier	May 8, 2009	177
Olivia pretends that her cat and her dog are her babies and develops some useful maternal skills, which leads to some trouble. Olivia wants to sell more cookies than anyone else in her Young Pioneers girl scout troop. Also, she loses her so called lucky tights.: Rules of Life: #21: Little brothers do not know anything about being a mommy. #34: Sometimes your lucky tights are even luckier than you thought.
18	18	"Olivia Acts Out Olivia and Grandma's Visit"	Patricia Resnick Eryk Casemiro & Kate Boutilier	September 9, 2009 (Note: This episode was first released in Olivia DVD on August 11, 2009.)	118
Olivia wants to be the queen of the fairies but Francine was chosen to be the queen instead, also she annoys her teacher with her constant mooing. Olivia has to share her room with Ian, and sprays stinky perfume all over it.: Rules of Life: #36: If you are stuck being Cow Number 2, it is good to have a moon to jump over. #49: Little brothers always wants the same things you want.
19	19	"Olivia and Her Alien Brother Olivia's Lemonade Stand"	Jill Gorey & Barbara Herndon Eryk Casemiro & Kate Boutilier	November 10, 2009	119
After a trip to the planetarium, Olivia begins to believe that Ian is an alien. Olivia's lemonade stand is losing customers to Francine's pink lemonade stand. So she opens a restaurant at her backyard and realize that it's missing something that Francine has: something pink.: Rules of Life: #111: No matter what planet your brother is from, he is probably still going to have bad manners. #52: Never seat your customers under an angry squirrel with acorns, unless they insist.; Note: Olivia already said "Rule of Life #52" on "Olivia plays Piano" and "Olivia's Lemonade Stand" for unknown reasons.
20	20	"Olivia Runs a Carnival Olivia Explores the Attic"	Joe Purdy Joan Considine Johnson	November 11, 2009	120
Olivia plans a carnival for her school's Parents Night. Olivia is inspired to create a time capsule after she finds one her grandmother made.: Rules of Life: #33: If you are not careful, you might get talked into dressing up a dog as an alien. #33: Baby brothers are cute, but they do not always know what they're talking about.; Note: Olivia already said "Rule of Life #33" in these two episodes for unknown reasons.
21	21	"Olivia Plants a Garden Olivia's Pirate Treasure"	Rachel Ruderman & Laurie Israel Jill Gorey & Barbara Herndon	November 12, 2009	121
Olivia wanted to take a plant to her school, but her dog, Perry sabotages everything. Olivia finds pirate treasure and Ian gets attacked by hungry pelicans.: Rules of Life: #88: A while can be a very, very, very long time when you are six and three quarters. #19: Sometimes you just have to use your big voice.
22	22	"Olivia and the Old West Olivia's Fashion Show"	Ty Lieberman Silvia Olivas	November 13, 2009	122
Olivia's in charge while Mrs. Hogenmuller is gone. Olivia opens a fashion show.: Note: There aren't any Rules of Life in these two episodes for unknown reasons.
23	23	"Olivia and the Family Photo Olivia Claus"	Jill Gorey & Barbara Herndon Patricia Resnick	December 13, 2009	123
Olivia attempts to take a family photo in the middle of summer. In the Christmas special, Olivia pretends to be Santa Claus, returning lost toys.: Rules of Life: #51: Being a flying reindeer takes a lot of energy, so it is good to feed them vegetables.; Note: In "Olivia and the Family Photo", Olivia doesn't say a Rule of Life.
24	24	"Olivia Goes to the Beach Olivia Keeps a Secret"	Kate Boutilier & Eryk Casemiro	April 29, 2010	124
Grandma takes Olivia and Ian to a special beach. Olivia wants to help plan Francine's birthday party.: Rules of Life: #54: Mothers know lots of things, but only grandmothers really know how to pack for a vacation. #24: Just because it's called a veggie loaf, doesn't mean it can not be something more exciting, like a veggie castle.; Goof: In the previous episode, "Olivia Plays Soccer", Olivia said her birthday was in two months and Francine's was in ten months. Olivia's dad said she was 6 and 3/4. Olivia should have already been 7 by this episode.
25	25	"Olivia Goes to the Library Olivia Makes a Wedding Gift"	Kate Boutilier & Eryk Casemiro Patricia Resnick	April 24, 2010	125
Olivia and Ian search for her missing library book so that she can finish reading it. Olivia and her classmates give their teacher a handmade wedding present.: Rules of Life: #8: Even when little brothers are being quiet, they can still find a way to bother you. #55: If you want to have a dog walking business, it is better to just stick to walking dogs.; Trivia: These episodes are available on iTunes long before they aired.

=== Season 2 (2010–2015) ===
In season 2, Ian is wearing a small planet on his T-shirt and he has a deeper voice and Francine, Daisy, Julian and Olivia's Mom have different voices. In season 1, Ian has a default shirt. Olivia's Mom has the same color clothes.

No. overall	No. in season	Title	Written by	Original release date	Prod. code
26	1	"Olivia Talks Turkey Olivia's Hiking Adventure"	Chris Nee Mark Valenti	November 21, 2010	201
Olivia takes up into a new hobby with a turkey calling, and Olivia sings Habanera from Carmen with her pet Turkey. Olivia's father accompanies her and Francine as they turn into Pioneer Scouts. Note: Olivia no longer says any more rules of life starting from this episode. Also, William is wearing a shirt with stars in further episodes he wears a one-piece. This was the first episode to feature the Goodnight Song in the series, and the song was also used throughout the whole season.
27	2	"Olivia's Christmas Surprise Olivia Builds a Snowlady"	Scott Sonneborn Gabe Pulliam	December 12, 2010	202
Olivia hides Ian's Christmas gift in the backyard, but she has trouble finding it after it snows. Olivia resorts to building a snowman out of cotton candy because the snow has melted, they get their picture on the paper and Olivia sings about becoming famous.
28	3	"Puppy Love Magnificent Magnet Girl"	Matt Negrete Jay Abramowitz	June 19, 2011	203
Olivia plans a canine wedding for Perry, then she has to track down the runaway bride. Olivia puts on a show for everyone. Note: This episode aired after a small hiatus of the series.
29	4	"Princess for a Day"	Kent Redeker	September 18, 2011 (Note: This episode was first released on Princess For a Day DVD on September 6, 2011.)	204
Olivia meets Princess Stephanie who has a very similar appearance to her. The two decide to switch places. However, Stephanie's parents must fly back to their home country and they shall take Olivia/Stephanie with them. Now, Stephanie and Olivia must find a way to get Stephanie back to her castle and for them to switch places. Also this is a double-length episode lasting 20 minutes. Note: This episode is based on Barbie as the Princess and the Pauper as Olivia portrays the upper class Princess Anneliese and Stephanie portrays the lower class pauper Erika who switch places for a while.
30	5	"Olivia and the Treasure Hunt"	Patricia Resnick	March 20, 2011	205
Olivia's family participates in a town-wide treasure hunt, which involves searching for clues and doing goofy tricks. Note: This is the only season 2 episode where Olivia says a Rule of Life. Rules of Life: #62: The harder you try not to giggle, the more the giggles try to come out.
31	6	"Olivia's Old West Treasure Hunt Olivia Makes It Rain"	Matt Negrete Michael Stern	April 17, 2011	206
Olivia and her classmates look for a lost key to the school bus and find a hidden treasure. Olivia plans to attend a toy-boat race, but a problem arises: the pond has no water.
32	7	"Olivia's Kite Party Olivia Builds a House"	Jack Monaco Jule Selbo	April 17, 2011	207
Olivia and her friends want to fly their kites, but the wind has stopped blowing. Olivia and Ian try to rebuild their father's broken scale-model house, but they need to fix it in time before her father gets here and build it on a much larger scale.
33	8	"Olivia's Tip Top Tapper Olivia Plans a Tea Party"	Holly Huckins Madellaine Paxson	May 8, 2011	208
Olivia injures her leg before her tap-dance recital, but she finds a clever way to perform. Olivia fills in for her sick mom and hosts a pirate-themed tea party.
34	9	"Olivia's Charmed Life Olivia's Pet Project"	Chris Nee Matt Negrete	November 8, 2012	209
Olivia has to find a new birthday gift for Francine after the charm bracelet she'd planned to give her accidentally falls down the drain. When Perry starts teaching Daisy's dog some bad habits, Olivia is determined to teach him good manners.
35	10	"Olivia's Dog Wash Meteor Mania"	Peggy Sarlin Scott Gray	August 21, 2011	210
Olivia starts her own dog-washing service to raise money for the library. Olivia tries to keep her family awake so they can see the meteor shower.
36	11	"Olivia's Staycation Olivia's Butterfly Adventure"	Catherine Lieuwen Scott Gray	August 10, 2013	211
When the family prepares to go on a cruise at sea, Ian breaks out with a rash, causing it to be canceled. Olivia takes her family and friends on the backyard cruise of their lives. Olivia and Francine search for Ian's butterfly after it escapes during show and tell. Note: This episode aired after a second hiatus of the series.
37	12	"Olivia the Firefighter Olivia Gives the Best Gift Ever"	Ursula Ziegler & Michele Gendelman Andy Guerdat & Steve Sullivan	October 26, 2015	212
A firefighter visits Olivia's class, and inspires her to want to follow in his footsteps. William prepares to celebrate his first birthday, and Olivia is determined to give him the best present ever. Note: This episode aired after a third hiatus of the series.
38	13	"Teacher of the Year Olivia and the Talent Show"	Scott Gray Peggy Sarlin	October 27, 2015	213
Mrs. Hogenmuller is being evaluated for a Teacher of the Year award, and Olivia is determined to make sure everything goes smoothly. Despite her best efforts, chaos ensues. Luckily, she has a plan to show Mrs. Hogenmuller that she doesn't need an award to be teacher of the year in the eyes of her students. A big school talent show is coming up, and Olivia is looking forward to wowing the crowd with her drum playing, but moments before she's scheduled to take the stage her drum kit is accidentally destroyed. Olivia has to think fast, drumming in trash cans and other items in a rousing Stomp-like performance.
39	14	"Hoedown Hero Olivia's Road Race"	Anna Cranage Mike Rabb	October 28, 2015	214
During dance lessons, Olivia finds herself partnered by clumsy Harold Hockenberry. On the eve of the annual soapbox derby, a sudden rainstorm soaks Olivia's cardboard car and completely ruins it. However, she turns Perry's doghouse into a race car and triumphantly wins the race.
40	15	"Joy Olivia and the Mighty Five"	Madellaine Paxson Kent Redeker	October 29, 2015	215
The annual town dance competition is coming up, and Olivia is determined to put an end to the reigning champs (The Prancer Dancers) winning streak. With some help from Grandma, she forms her own rag-tag dance troupe, and learns a thing or two about dancing for the pure joy of it. After Olivia and her dad spend an afternoon reading superhero comics, a toy of William's suddenly goes missing. To get William's toy back, Olivia recruits her friends to form her own crime-solving, superhero team. Note: This is the series finale of Olivia and also the final episode to feature the Goodnight Song.
