= Gaspard and Lisa (TV series) =

- Gaspard and Lisa title card
- Genre: Children's; Animated
- Created by: Anne Gutman
- Directed by: Kitty Taylor
- Voices of: Connor Fitzgerald; Kisholi Perera-Merry
- Composer: Stuart Kollmorgen
- Countries of origin: United States; France; United Kingdom
- Original languages: English; French
- No. of seasons: 2
- No. of episodes: 51

Production
- Executive producers: Paula Rosenthal; Diana Manson; Peter Scott
- Producers: Vanessa Amberleigh; Alison Ray; Jennifer Upton
- Running time: 22 minutes
- Production companies: Chorion; Impossible Television

Original release
- Network: TF1 and Canal+ Family (France); CITV (UK); Disney Junior (US)
- Release: 2010
- Release: 1 May 2011 – 13 July 2013

Gaspard and Lisa is an animated entertainment series aimed at pre-school children. The series is based on the books written by Anne Gutman and illustrated by Georg Hallensleben. The series was made as a co-production between Chorion and animation company Impossible TV. It debuted at the end of 2010 on TF1 in France. In the UK, it aired from 1 May 2011 to 13 July 2013 on CITV.

== Overview ==
Gaspard and Lisa engage in various adventures and activities. Though they try to do good deeds, their behavior sometimes causes disturbance to other people, especially Mr. Huget (pronounced hoo-zhay). They say, "Uh-oh, catastrophe!" when they learn that they have created a problem, but "Yes, triumph!" when they fix the problem.

== Characters ==
This is a list of the characters in Gaspard and Lisa. In order:

=== Main ===
- Gaspard (voiced by Connor Fitzgerald in the UK and Peter Harris in the US) is an anthropomorphic black dog who is the protagonist of the series. He wears a blue scarf and lives in a high rise apartment. Like children his age, he attends a school that appears to be the same one attended by his best friend Lisa. Gaspard originated from a town outside Paris, as he and his family moved to Paris a few years later. When he entered the Parisian school, it was there he met Lisa. He is also the newest member in his school. During his early days in class, he was a very shy fellow whom the children laugh at because he brought a large bag with a lot of props. Though a judo practitioner, Gaspard has a slight fear of chickens. Thankfully, Lisa made him look special in front of them and he got over his shyness.
- Lisa (voiced by Kisholi Perera-Merry in the UK and Alyson Stoner in the US) is an anthropomorphic white dog who is Gaspard's best friend. She wears a red scarf and lives in the Pompidou Centre. Wherever Gaspard goes, Lisa is often with him, even on Gaspard's visits to his grandmother. She also likes to sing and dance, especially when it comes to cheering up Gaspard whenever he gets a little glum. Whenever she sobs, she sniffs, but sheds no tears.

==== Gaspard's family ====
- Charles (voiced by Robert Naylor) is Gaspard's older brother. He is a chess enthusiast and always wears headphones around his neck. Though he acts like a snob to Gaspard and Lisa sometimes, he also shows some acts of kindness towards them.
- Gaspard's Dad (voiced by Simon Greenall) wears a blue and green striped tie. He works as a newspaper columnist and even as a competitive cyclist. He has an allergy to cats.
- Gaspard's Mom (voiced by Teresa Gallagher) is a housewife and wears a purple pearl necklace.
  - Gallagher also voices Mamie Mathilde, Gaspard's paternal grandmother who lives in a blue house far from the city of Paris, and Lisa's Maman, whose appearance is exactly the same as Gaspard's Mom, except the skin colour is the same as that of Lisa.

==== Lisa's family ====
- Victoria (voiced by Bessie Cursons) is Lisa's older sister. Both she and Charles share the distinction of being occasionally snobbish to Gaspard and Lisa, although Charles is slightly nicer than Victoria is. She also seems to resent Lisa when she pushed her little sister's books off the shelf or scatter the puzzle Lisa made. Her only compliment to Lisa occurred when Lisa learned to ride a bicycle without training wheels.
- Lila (voiced by Taylor Barber) is Lisa's baby sister. She wears a purple onesie. A full-length episode of the series tells the story of when Lila was born and how Lisa was a little jealous at first, but then began to love her sister.
- Lisa's Papa (voiced by Tim Whitnall) wears a gray jacket.
- Lisa's Grandfather (voiced by Paul Soles) has a very deep voice and wears a brown vest. He is a bit of a magician, enjoys biscuits and also has a wife whom he has been married to for four decades.

=== Humans ===
- Mlle Baladi (named as Mrs. Davis in the US) (voiced by Linda Ballantyne) is Gaspard and Lisa's teacher. She travels on a yellow bicycle.
- Monsieur Huget (voiced by Derek McGrath) is an old man who happens to live in the same apartment Gaspard lives. He is often the brunt of trouble caused by Gaspard and Lisa's naivete.
- Bastian (voiced by Dallas Jokic in episodes 1-26 and Drew Adkins from episode 27 onwards) is one of Gaspard and Lisa's classmates.
- Adrian (voiced by Tyler Stevenson in episodes 1-26, Gage Munroe in episodes 27-44 and Drew Davis from episode 45 onwards) is a French boy of African heritage who is another one of Gaspard and Lisa's classmates.
- Erica (voiced by Isabel DeCarteret) is the only known girl at the school.
- Victoria (voiced by Samantha Weinstein) is one of Victoria's two friends and the only one named. She gave a kitten to Lisa who in turn gave it to Monsieur Huget.
- Madame Perrault (voiced by Katie Griffin) is Mlle Baladi/Mrs. Davis's colleague who has a great passion for art.
- Monsieur Delphy (voiced by Richard Ian Cox) is a man in his early-20s and the owner of a pet store.
- Madame Merosh (voiced by Julie Lemieux) is an old woman and the baker.

=== Other ===
- John-Claude is Mlle Baladi/Mrs. Davis' pet Jack Russell Terrier who sometimes takes Mlle Baladi/Mrs. Davis to her outings.
- Prince is Mamie Mathilde's pet dog. It's unknown if his breed is a Labrador Retriever or a Golden Retriever.

== Episodes ==
The episode titles are spoken by either Gaspard or Lisa; each episode is approximately ten minutes long, unless otherwise noted.

No.	Title
1	"Space Rocket"
Gaspard and Lisa accidentally break Charles' model rocket and have to find a way to fix it before the greatest contest ever-made.
2	"Our Class Pet"
Lisa takes the school guinea pig home with her, but when it gets loose, she and Gaspard have to decide whether to cover up or come clean.
3	"Victoria's New Wallpaper"
Lisa's father is putting up new wallpaper in her older sister Victoria's room. However, this means Lisa will have to share her room with her sister until the wallpaper is up as Lisa isn't happy about sharing her room, especially when her sister tries to take over. Now, Gaspard and Lisa decide to finish the job, so Lisa can have her room back.
4	"Gaspard's Garden for Mama"
Returning to the city after visiting his grandmother in the country, Gaspard and his family bring home a box of fresh vegetables from his grandmother's garden. As his mother loves fresh tomatoes, he decides to grow tomatoes just for her. So with Lisa's help he makes a 'secret garden' under his bader. However, when he waters the tomatoes he doesn't realise he's actually watering M. Huget's ceiling as well.
5	"Mama's Broken Vase"
Gaspard and Lisa accidentally break Lisa's mother's favorite vase and work together to fix the damage.
6	"The Kite That Got Away"
Gaspard and Lisa accidentally let Charles' special kite go and they have to retrieve it.
7	"Gaspard's Egg"
After Gaspard and Lisa let a chicken out of Granny Mathilde's neighbor's henhouse, they have to keep the egg warm while they search for the missing bird.
8	"Prince's Muddy Mess"
Prince gets muddy while Gaspard and Lisa are watching him, and they have to figure out a way to make things right with Granny Mathilde.
9	"Our Talent Show"
Gaspard and Lisa argue about who's the star of the magic act they are going to put on at the school talent show edition. However, Gaspard quits, only to return to help Lisa.
10	"Best Friends' Puppet Show"
Gaspard and Lisa try to stage their own puppet show, but catastrophe: the puppets have gone missing and everyone has arrived for the show.
11	"Gaspard's Toys For Sale"
Gaspard wants a shiny new truck but doesn't have enough money, so he and Lisa try to find ways to raise funds.
12	"School Pet Day"
Gaspard and Lisa borrow M. Delpy's parrot to take to school pet day, but the parrot gets loose and they have to retrieve it.
13	"A Christmas Surprise"
It's almost Christmas and Gaspard and Lisa need to find a present for their teacher, fast. Gaspard is full of ideas, but none of them seems quite right.
14	"Mystery of the Missing Tomatoes"
Gaspard and Lisa take a trip to Gaspard's Granny Mathilde's in the country. While there, they try to solve the mystery of Granny Mathilde's missing tomatoes.
15	"Mama's Special Day"
When the gift Lisa has made with mother for a special day has ruined, catastrophe; now, Gaspard helps Lisa find mother a new gift in time for this special.
16	"Shopping with Mama"
Gaspard and Lisa cause havoc in the department store while waiting for Victoria and Mama. At that time, Charles tries to be part of the chess game with the best in the world.
17	"Monsieur Huget's Special Day"
Gaspard and Lisa resolve to make M. Huget smile as he bird-watches, but then learn the truth behind his upsetting mood—it's his birthday exclusively.
18	"Our Walk With John-Claude"
Gaspard and Lisa accidentally let Mlle Baladi/Ms. Davis' pet dog loose in the park and have to retrieve him.
19	"Our First Train Ride"
Gaspard and Lisa are excited to take their first train ride, and when they get in trouble with the Conductor, Papa comes to their aid.
20	"Our Sweet Treat"
The special pastry that Lisa's mother has made gets eaten on Gaspard and Lisa's watch, so they figure out how to replace it.
21	"Gaspard's Puppy"
Gaspard babysits a puppy with Lisa's help and finds out it's harder than he thought.
22	"Our Very Special Delivery"
Gaspard and Lisa ruin the special cake they've picked up for Lisa's grandparents' party and try to restore it.
23	"When Gaspard Met Lisa"
Gaspard and Lisa recall how they first met and, after a bumpy start, became best friends.
24	"Seaside Sculptures"
Gaspard and Lisa visit the beach with their class for Art Day and, even though a wave destroys their sand castle, they learn that the tide can give back as well
25	"Our Big Big Sale"
Gaspard and Lisa help Mamie Mathilde get ready for a junk sale, but when the keys get locked in the car, Lisa saves the day.
26	"Best Friends Forever"
The friendship is threatened when Gaspard learns to whistle and Lisa doesn't due to stalling her finger.
27	"Gaspard The Great"
Gaspard thinks he makes Lisa's Grandpere disappear, so they have to 'bring him back' before Mama gets home.
28	"Gaspard Mails A Letter"
Gaspard offers to mail an important letter for Charles by the end of the day but, despite Lisa's help, he keeps forgetting.
29	"Gaspard's Hoppy Friend"
Gaspard and Lisa bring a frog home from the country by mistake and Gaspard decides to keep it as a pet.
30	"Our Big Baking Disaster"
Granny Mathilde comes over to teach Gaspard and Lisa how to make French bread; however, catastrophe: they add too much yeast to the dough for them.
31	"Our School Concert"
Gaspard and Lisa bring their instruments home from school to rehearse for the big show, but have to improvise when the instruments get lost.
32	"Our Treasure Hunt"
Gaspard and Lisa have to play pirates when Prince buries Granny Mathilde's bracelet somewhere in the yard.
33	"Our Clubhouse"
Gaspard and Lisa decide to start their own club, but have trouble finding a secret place to meet.
34	"Our Snowy Day"
On a snowy day at school, Gaspard and Lisa build a giant snow bear in the playground; however, catastrophe: they try to move it.
35	"Lisa's Scarf"
Lisa's scarf is carried off by the wind, so she—along with Gaspard and Monsieur Huget—help it track down.
36	"Lisa's Kitten"
Lisa has found a stray kitten and with Gaspard's help, secretly keeps it in his bedroom until they're found out.
37	"Best Bicycle Friends"
Lisa feels left out when Gaspard learns to ride his bike without training wheels.
38	"Papa's Important Paper"
Gaspard's Papa loses an important piece of paper, and Gaspard and Lisa help him find it, turning his home office upside down in the process.
39	"Best Friends' Baguette"
Gaspard and Lisa are given the important task of buying a baguette, but end up eating it before they get home and have to figure out how to replace it.
40	"Lisa's Hiccups"
When Lisa's dance performance is jeopardized by a case of the hiccups, Gaspard tries to help her get rid of them.
41	"Parrots on the Loose"
Gaspard and Lisa, helping out in M. Delpy's pet store, accidentally let the parrots out of their cage and have to retrieve them before the store opens.
42	"Our Judo Lessons"
Gaspard feels disappointed when Lisa joins his judo class and becomes better at it than him.
43	"Gaspard's Bag of Trouble"
Gaspard's bag has a hole in it. He, Charles and Lisa have to retrieve all the lost objects, including an important library book.
44	"The Perfect Family"
Lisa helps Gaspard when he accidentally ruins a family photo that was supposed to be a present for his parents.
45	"The Big Bicycle Race"
Gaspard and Lisa accidentally send the local bicycle race off-course and, trying to correct their mistake, end up joining in.
46	"The School Project"
When Gaspard stays home from school with a cold, Lisa has to cope with missing her friend and figure out how to present their school project.
47	"Gaspard's Masterpiece"
Gaspard's art class painting gets lost, so Lisa helps him find it, in the most unusual of places.
48	"Ducks in a Row"
Gaspard and Lisa make friends with a duck at the park, but chaos reigns when the duck invades the family picnic with some of his friends.
49	"Monster Hunters"
When they hear mysterious sounds, Gaspard and Lisa are convinced that there's a monster trapped at Gaspard's and are determined to get rid of it.
50	"Our Best Christmas Ever"
Gaspard and Lisa learn about the true spirit of Christmas when they both ask Santa for the same snow globe; however, it's the only one in the world this year.
51	"Lisa's Little Sister"
In the series finale, Lisa remembers how she felt neglected when her little sister was born, until she realized that she'll always be special to her mother. Note: This is the only double-length episode of the series.

== Broadcast ==
Gaspard and Lisa aired on ABC 4 Kids in Australia, on TVOKids and Knowledge Network in Canada, on TVNZ Kidzone24 in New Zealand, on Nick Jr. in Southeast Asia, on CITV in the UK and on Disney Junior in the US. It also aired on Discovery Kids in Latin America.
