= Ian Falconer =

American author and illustrator (1959–2023)

- Born: Ian Woodward Falconer; August 25, 1959; Ridgefield, Connecticut, U.S.
- Died: March 7, 2023 (aged 63); Norfolk, Connecticut, U.S.
- Occupations: Illustrator, children's writer, costume designer

Ian Woodward Falconer (August 25, 1959 – March 7, 2023) was an American author, illustrator, set designer, and costume designer. Falconer was a muse to pop artist David Hockney, with whom he collaborated on designing costumes for theatrical productions. Falconer created several magazine covers for The New Yorker and other publications. In 2001, he received a Caldecott Honor for writing and illustrating the Olivia children's book series.

== Early life and education ==
Ian Woodward Falconer was born on August 25, 1959, in Ridgefield, Connecticut, to parents Alexandra and Bruce Falconer. His mother co-owned a gourmet food store, taught art, and operated a sailing school, while his father worked as an architect.

Falconer graduated from The Cambridge School of Weston and studied art history at New York University before transferring to the Parsons School of Design.

When Falconer was 19, he met artist David Hockney at the New York apartment of curator Henry Geldzahler. After they developed a relationship, Falconer transferred to the Otis Art Institute when Hockney returned to Los Angeles in 1981. Falconer, however, quit college because he felt that it only taught him "cottage crafts," declaring that "he needed no other teacher than David Hockney."

== Career ==
=== Theater designs ===
Falconer was active in the world of theater design. In 1987, he assisted Hockney with the costume designs for the Los Angeles Opera's production of Richard Wagner's Tristan und Isolde; in 1992 he assisted Hockney with the Chicago Lyric Opera's production of Puccini's Turandot. In 1992, Falconer designed the costumes and Hockney designed the sets for The Royal Opera's production of Richard Strauss' Die Frau ohne Schatten at Covent Garden.

In 1996, Falconer designed the set for The Atlantic Theater's production of The Santaland Diaries, written by David Sedaris. The theater critic for The New York Times, Ben Brantley, wrote "The cartoon cutout set by Ian Falconer looks totally chic in its monochromatic grayness."

In 1999, Falconer designed scenery and costumes for the Boston Ballet's production of Igor Stravinsky's The Firebird, choreographed by Christopher Wheeldon. In the same year, he designed the sets for Scènes de Ballet. In 2001 he designed the sets and costumes for Felix Mendelssohn's Variations sérieuses. Wheeldon choreographed for both productions of the New York City Ballet. In 2002, Falconer designed the sets and costumes for Stravinsky's Jeu de Cartes, choreographed for the New York City Ballet by Peter Martins.

In 2007, Falconer's designs were included in the exhibition "StageStruck: The Magic of Theatre Design" presented by the Leslie/Lohman Gay Art Foundation Gallery in New York City.

In 2008, Falconer designed the sets and oversaw the installation for the operetta Veronique at the Théâtre du Châtelet in Paris. Francis Carlin, a critic, noted, "Ian Falconer's clever play-off between background film and lavish sets climaxes in a stunning society ball." Beginning with the 2015 season, the Pacific Northwest Ballet's The Nutcracker features costumes and sets designed by Falconer.

=== Paintings ===
In 1988, Falconer had his first solo exhibition at the L.A. Louver gallery in Venice, Los Angeles where the 20 paintings on view sold out within days of the opening. The exhibition attracted prominent collectors, dealers, and curators, as well as figures such as Thomas Dolby and Billy Wilder. Falconer was praised for employing "a personal approach to Hockney-style cubism, emphasizing tonal qualities of the human figure and complex interior spaces." Hockney, who attended the opening, remarked, "He is my only student, so I don't like to talk too much about his work… He's quite deserving of this show." Falconer acknowledged Hockney's influence, stating, "I've learned a great deal from David… but most of what I've learned from him has not been from his paintings. It's been about how to look and see and appreciate,' adding that he was drawn to finding beauty in everyday subjects. Like Hockney, Falconer employed vivid colors and whimsical imagery, which he said reflected his own resistance to the "East Coast academic avant-garde."

=== Illustration, and writing career ===
In 1996, Françoise Mouly, art editor of The New Yorker, hired Falconer to create illustrations for the magazine. Falconer made 30 covers for The New Yorker.

His covers for The New Yorker caught the eye of Simon & Schuster children's book editor Anne Schwartz, who approached Falconer about the possibility of illustrating a children's book by another author. Falconer shared the manuscript for Olivia, a book about a young pig named Olivia, inspired by his niece. After he took Schwartz's suggestion to cut down the manuscript, the book was published in 2000. The book was an instant success. It received the Caldecott Honor, sold over 10 million copies, and remained on the New York Times bestseller list for more than a year. The final book of his sequels, Olivia the Spy, was published in 2017.

In 2022, Falconer published a new children's book titled Two Dogs, about a pair of dachshunds named Perry and Augie, who were inspired by his nephews.

== Personal life ==
In the late 1970s, Falconer lived with his friend, photographer Patrick McMullan, in New York.

Falconer dated fashion designer and filmmaker Tom Ford, whom he had met in 1979 while attending New York University. They remained good friends after their breakup, and Ford used Falconer's surname for the title character in his 2009 film A Single Man (based on the Christopher Isherwood novel, in which the title character has no surname).

Falconer had a relationship with artist David Hockney, who was both his mentor and lover. After moving out of Hockney's Los Angeles home, he lived with his boyfriend Butch Kirby, who was an actor known as "Butchie," and their dachshund Heinz.

== Death ==
In later life, Falconer lived in Rowayton, Connecticut, a village within the city of Norwalk. He died from kidney failure in Norwalk on March 7, 2023, at the age of 63. He was survived by his mother, Alexandra Austin, and two sisters, Tonia Falconer Barringer and Tory Falconer Crane.

== Written works ==
- Olivia (New York: Atheneum Books for Young Readers, 2000)
- Olivia Saves the Circus (New York: Atheneum Books for Young Readers, 2001)
- Olivia's Opposites (New York: Atheneum Books for Young Readers, 2002)
- Olivia Counts (New York: Atheneum Books for Young Readers, 2002)
- Olivia...and the Missing Toy (New York: Atheneum Books for Young Readers, 2003)
- Teatro Olivia (New York: Rizzoli Universe Promotional Books, 2004)
- Olivia Forms a Band (New York: Atheneum Books for Young Readers, 2006)
- Dream Big: Starring Olivia (New York: Andrews McMeel Publishing, 2006)
- Olivia Helps with Christmas (New York: Atheneum Books for Young Readers, 2007)
- Olivia Goes to Venice (New York: Atheneum Books for Young Readers, 2010)
- Olivia and the Fairy Princesses (New York: Atheneum Books for Young Readers, 2012)
- Olivia's ABC (New York: Atheneum Books for Young Readers, 2014)
- Olivia the Spy (New York: Atheneum Books for Young Readers, 2017)
- Two Dogs (New York: HarperCollins/Michael di Capua Books, 2022)

== Awards ==
- Caldecott Honor for Olivia, 2001
- Parents' Choice 2000, Gold Award winner
- Nick Jr. Books, Best Book of 2001
- American Library Association, Notable Children's Books of 2001, for Olivia
- Child's Best Book of 2001
- Los Angeles Times Best Books of 2000 & 2001
- Publishers Weekly, Best Books of 2000 & 2001
- American Library Association, Notable Children's Books of 2002, for Olivia Saves the Circus
- BookSense Illustrated Children's Book of the Year, 2002, for Olivia Saves the Circus
- Child Magazine's Best Children's Book Award in 2006, for Olivia Forms a Band
- Voted "Favorite Illustrator" for Olivia Helps with Christmas by over 50,000 children at the Children's Choice Book Awards, 2008
