= List of popular Christmas singles in the United States =

The following is a list of popular Christmas songs recorded by various artists, many of which have hit on various charts, mostly in the United States (some only released in the artist's home country). The year indicates the original year of release for that artist's recorded version of the single or track, which may not necessarily be the first year the artist's version appeared on one or more popular music charts by various music trade publications. Many tracks were re-released as singles in subsequent years.

== A ==
Title	Artist	Year	Additional information
"A' Soalin'"	Peter, Paul and Mary	1963	Peaked at #15 on Billboard's Christmas Charts 12/28/1963. From the album Moving. Written by Paul Stookey, Tracy Batteste & Elaina Mezzetti. Contains an element of "God Rest Ye Merry, Gentlemen".
"Adeste Fideles" ("O Come, All Ye Faithful")	Associated Glee Clubs of America	1925	Peaked at No. 5 on the Billboard pop singles chart in 1925. This historic record was the first electrically recorded disc to create a popular impact, and featured the largest choir popular music has ever known: some 4,800 voices (according to Columbia Records). Over 150 versions of this standard have appeared in Christmas LPs since 1946.
"Adeste Fideles" ("O Come, All Ye Faithful")	Bing Crosby	1942	Peaked at No. 45 on the Billboard Hot 100 singles chart on the week ending December 26, 1960.
"All Alone on Christmas"	Darlene Love	1992	Peaked at No. 83 on the Billboard Hot 100 singles chart in 1993. From the 1992 film Home Alone 2: Lost in New York.
"All I Really Want for Christmas"	Steven Curtis Chapman	2005	Peaked at No. 2 on the Billboard Christian Songs chart in 2006. From the album All I Really Want for Christmas.
"All I Want for Christmas Is a Real Good Tan"	Kenny Chesney	2003	Peaked at No. 30 on Billboard's Hot Country Singles & Tracks chart. From the album All I Want for Christmas Is a Real Good Tan.
"All I Want for Christmas Is My Two Front Teeth"	Spike Jones and his City Slickers	1948	Spent three weeks at No. 1 on Billboard's Records Most Played by Disk Jockeys chart in 1948 and 1949. Also peaked at No. 14 on Billboard's Children's Records chart and No. 18 on Billboard's Best-Selling Pop Singles chart in 1950. Written by Donald Yetter Gardner.
"All I Want for Christmas Is You" (1)	Carla Thomas	1963	Written by Andrew Charles Williams. Originally released as the B-side of Thomas's 1963 holiday hit, "Gee Whiz, It's Christmas". A new version recorded by Thomas peaked at No. 11 on Billboard's Christmas Singles chart in 1966.
"All I Want for Christmas Is You" (2)	Vince Vance & The Valiants	1989	First released as a single in 1989, but didn't become a country radio chart hit until 1993. Re-charted in 1994–1997. Peaked at No. 31 on Billboard's Hot Country Singles & Tracks chart in 1999. Melody is the same as Bobby Vinton's 1964 top 10 pop hit, "My Heart Belongs to Only You".
"All I Want for Christmas Is You" (3)	Mariah Carey	1994	Peaked at No. 12 on Billboard's Radio Songs chart and No. 6 on Billboard's Adult Contemporary chart on the first week of January 1995, and three weeks at No. 1 on the Billboard Hot 100 chart in December 2019 into early January 2020. Written by Walter Afanasieff and Mariah Carey.
"All I Want for Christmas Is You" (3)	Lady Antebellum	2010	Peaked at No. 38 on the Billboard Hot Country Songs chart on the week ending January 8, 2011. Also peaked at No. 24 on the Billboard Hot Christian Songs chart (week ending January 8, 2011) and at No. 14 on the Billboard Holiday Digital Song Sales chart (week ending November 10, 2012).
"All I Want for Christmas Is You" (3)	Newsboys	2010	Peaked at No. 24 on the Billboard Hot Christian Songs chart on the week ending January 8, 2011.
"All I Want for Christmas Is You" (3)	Justin Bieber with Mariah Carey	2011	Subtitled "SuperFestive!" Peaked at No. 3 on the Billboard Adult Contemporary chart on the week ending December 31, 2011. Also peaked at No. 86 on the main Billboard Hot 100 chart (week ending November 19, 2011), at No. 20 on the Billboard Holiday 100 chart (week ending December 17, 2011), at No. 51 on the Billboard Digital Song Sales chart (week ending November 19, 2011), at No. 1 on the Billboard Holiday Digital Song Sales chart (week ending November 19, 2011), and at No. 20 on the Billboard Holiday Streaming Songs chart (week ending December 14, 2013).
"All I Want for Christmas Is You" (3)	Michael Bublé	2011	Peaked at No. 1 for five consecutive weeks on Billboard's Adult Contemporary chart (from the week ending December 10, 2011, to the week ending January 7, 2012). Both debuted and peaked at No. 99 on Billboard's main Hot 100 chart (on the week ending December 31, 2011). Also made these other Billboard music charts (with peak positions shown): Bubbling Under Hot 100 (No. 1), Greatest of All Time Holiday 100 Songs (No. 52), Holiday 100 (No. 13), Holiday Airplay (No. 35), Holiday Digital Song Sales (No. 3), and Holiday Streaming Songs (No. 21).
"All My Love for Christmas"	Lonestar	1998	Peaked at No. 61 on Billboard's Hot Country Singles & Tracks chart in 1999. From the 1998 various artists album Country Christmas Classics on RCA Records.
"Amen"	The Impressions	1964	Featured in the 1963 film Lilies of the Field. Peaked at No. 7 on Billboard's Hot 100 singles chart on the week ending January 9, 1965, and at No. 17 on Billboard's Hot Rhythm & Blues Singles chart on the week ending January 30, 1965. An updated recording by the group titled "Amen (1970)" was released in November 1969, peaking at No. 44 on Billboard's Best Selling Soul Singles chart on the week ending January 10, 1970, and at No. 110 on Billboard's Bubbling Under The Hot 100 chart on the week ending January 3, 1970.
"Amen"	Lloyd Price and Erma Franklin	1964	Peaked at No. 124 on Billboard's Bubbling Under The Hot 100 chart on the week ending December 26, 1964.
"Angels Among Us"	Alabama	1993	Reached No. 51 on Billboard's Hot Country Singles & Tracks chart from unsolicited airplay, as a partial Christmas single from the band's album Cheap Seats. Charted again in 1994 and 1995.
"Angels We Have Heard on High"	Sonicflood	2003	Traditional French carol known as Les Anges dans nos campagnes translated to English in 1862 by James Chadwick. Peaked at No. 21 on the Billboard Christian Songs chart in 2004. Chris Tomlin also had a hit version on the Christian Songs chart in 2006, peaking at No. 5. Jim Brickman's piano rendition, under the title "Angels," ranked No. 27 on an all-time list compiled by Star 102.5.
"Another Lonely Christmas"	Prince and The Revolution	1984	Peaked at No. 5 on Billboard's Christmas Singles chart. Originally released as the B-side of Prince and The Revolution's 1984 single "I Would Die 4 U".
"At This Table"	Idina Menzel	2019	From the album Christmas: A Season of Love.
"Away in a Manger"	Reba McEntire	1987	Peaked at No. 73 on Billboard's Hot Country Singles & Tracks chart on the week ending January 9, 1999. From her 1987 holiday album Merry Christmas to You.
"Away in a Manger"	Kenny Chesney	1998	Peaked at No. 67 on Billboard's Hot Country Singles & Tracks chart on the week ending January 8, 2000.
"Away in a Manger"	Casting Crowns	2005	Peaked at No. 7 on Billboard's Hot Christian Songs chart on the week ending January 7, 2006.

== B ==
Title	Artist	Year	Additional information
"Babes in Toyland/March of the Toys"	Tommy Dorsey Orchestra	1939	Written by Victor Herbert and Glen MacDonough. Popular by Arthur Fiedler and the Boston Pops orchestra (1958). Later recorded by Doc Severinsen and the Tonight Show Orchestra (1991).
"A Baby Changes Everything"	Faith Hill	2008	Spent three weeks at No. 1 on Billboard's Hot Adult Contemporary Tracks chart. From Hill's first Christmas album, Joy to the World.
"Baby, It's Cold Outside"	Dinah Shore & Buddy Clark	1949	With orchestra under the direction of Ted Dale. Written in 1944 by Frank Loesser. From the 1949 film Neptune's Daughter starring Esther Williams and Red Skelton. Peaked at No. 3 on the Billboard Records Most Played By Disk Jockeys chart, at No. 4 on the Billboard Best-Selling Popular Retail Records chart, and at No. 6 on the Billboard Most-Played Juke Box Records chart in mid 1949.
"Baby, It's Cold Outside"	Margaret Whiting & Johnny Mercer	1949	With Paul Weston and his orchestra. Peaked at No. 3 on the Billboard Records Most Played By Disk Jockeys chart, at No. 4 on the Billboard Best-Selling Popular Retail Records chart, and at No. 8 on the Billboard Most-Played Juke Box Records chart in mid 1949.
"Baby, It's Cold Outside"	Ella Fitzgerald & Louis Jordan & His Tympany Five	1949	Peaked at No. 9 on the Billboard Most-Played Juke Box Records chart and at No. 17 on the Billboard Best-Selling Popular Retail Records chart in mid 1949.
"Baby, It's Cold Outside"	Don Cornell & Laura Leslie	1949	With Sammy Kaye and his orchestra. Peaked at No. 12 on the Billboard Records Most Played By Disk Jockeys chart, at No. 13 on the Billboard Best-Selling Popular Retail Records chart, and at No. 17 on the Billboard Most-Played Juke Box Records chart in mid 1949.
"Baby, It's Cold Outside"	Homer & Jethro with June Carter	1949	Peaked at No. 22 on the Billboard Records Most Played By Disk Jockeys chart on the week ending August 20, 1949.
"Baby, It's Cold Outside"	Dean Martin	1959	From Martin's 1959 album A Winter Romance (with female chorus and orchestra conducted by Gus Levene). First entered Billboard's Holiday 100 chart at No. 98 (on the week ending December 21, 2013), peaking at No. 17 five years later (on the week ending December 22, 2018). First entered Billboard's main Hot 100 chart at No. 45 (on the week ending January 4, 2020), peaking at No. 36 (on the week ending January 4, 2025, upon its first chart re-entry). Also made these other Billboard music charts (with peak positions shown): Global 200 (No. 71), Holiday Digital Song Sales (No. 1), Holiday Streaming Songs (No. 15), and Streaming Songs (No. 23).
"Baby, It's Cold Outside"	Ray Charles & Betty Carter	1962	With orchestra conducted by Marty Paich. Peaked at No. 91 on the Billboard Hot 100 chart on the week ending March 10, 1962.
"Baby, It's Cold Outside"	Lady Antebellum	2008	Peaked at No. 26 on the Billboard Holiday 100 chart on the week ending December 31, 2011, and at No. 6 on the Billboard Holiday Digital Song Sales chart on the week ending November 26, 2011.
"Baby, It's Cold Outside"	Glee Cast featuring Chris Colfer and Darren Criss	2010	Peaked at No. 57 on the Billboard Hot 100 chart on the week ending December 25, 2010. Performed in the 2010 Glee episode "A Very Glee Christmas."
"Baby, It's Cold Outside"	Idina Menzel and Michael Buble	2014	Spent three weeks at No. 1 on the Billboard Adult Contemporary chart from mid December 2014 into early January 2015. Also peaked at No. 14 on the Billboard Holiday 100 chart on the week ending December 13, 2014, and at 78 on the Billboard Hot 100 chart on the week ending December 6, 2014.
"Baby Jesus Is Born"	Garth Brooks	1999	Peaked at No. 62 on the Billboard Hot Country Singles & Tracks chart.
"Baby's First Christmas"	Connie Francis	1961	Featuring the Don Costa Orchestra. Peaked at No. 7 on Billboard's Middle-Road Singles chart and No. 24 on the Billboard Hot 100 singles chart in 1961, and at No. 13 on Billboard's Christmas Singles chart in 1965.
"Back Door Santa"	Clarence Carter	1968	Released on the 1968 various artists holiday soul album Soul Christmas. Also recorded by Bon Jovi for the 1987 various artists holiday compilation A Very Special Christmas (though it was removed from later pressings), and sampled by Run-D.M.C. for their hit, "Christmas in Hollis" (which was also included on A Very Special Christmas).
"Barefoot Santa Claus"	Sonny James (The Southern Gentleman)	1966	Peaked at No. 9 on Billboard's Christmas Singles chart. Charted again in 1968. Features a children's chorus on backing vocals. From the album My Christmas Dream.
"Beautiful Star of Bethlehem"	John Daniel Quintet	1954	A bluegrass staple that went on to be recorded by Ralph Stanley (multiple times), Jimmie Davis, and many others. Originally composed in 1938 by farmer and music teacher R. Fisher Boyce, and published in 1940.
"Because It's Christmas (For All the Children)"	Barry Manilow	1990	Peaked at No. 38 on the Billboard Hot Adult Contemporary Tracks chart in 1991. From Manilow's first Christmas album, Because It's Christmas.
"Believe"	Josh Groban	2004	Peaked at No. 1 for five weeks on the Billboard Hot Adult Contemporary Tracks chart, and "Bubbled under" the Billboard Hot 100 chart with a peak position of #112. From the 2004 film The Polar Express.
"The Bell That Couldn't Jingle"	Bobby Vinton	1964	Written by Burt Bacharach and Larry Kusik. Paul Evans, Bobby Helms, Herb Alpert, Anita Kerr, and Bacharach each recorded the song as well, but only Vinton's version charted, reaching No. 23 on the Billboard Christmas Singles chart.
"Belleau Wood"	Garth Brooks	1997	Peaked at No. 41 on Billboard Hot Country Singles & Tracks chart in 1998. From Brooks's album Sevens.
"The Bells of St. Mary's"	Bing Crosby	1945	Written by A. Emmett Adams and Douglas Furber in 1917. While the song has no lyrical relation to Christmas, its inclusion in the 1945 film of the same name has made it a popular choice for various artists' holiday albums.
"Better Days"	Goo Goo Dolls	2006	Despite its overtly Christian tone and obvious references to Christmas, this song managed to reach No. 3 on the Billboard Hot Adult Top 40 Tracks chart, and remains in regular rotation on hot adult top 40 stations.
"The Blessings"	Alabama	1996	Peaked at No. 72 on the Billboard Hot Country Singles & Tracks chart in 1997.
"Blue Christmas"	Ernest Tubb	1949	Peaked at No. 1 on Billboard's Most-Played Juke Box (Country & Western) Records chart in the issue dated January 7, 1950. Also made these other Billboard music charts in December 1949 (with peak positions shown): Best-Selling Retail Folk (Country & Western) Records (No. 2), Country & Western Records Most Played by Folk Disk Jockeys (No. 2), Records Most Played by Disk Jockeys (No. 23), and Most Played Juke Box Records (No. 26). Written as a country song by Billy Hayes and Jay W. Johnson in 1948, and first recorded by Doye O'Dell that year. Ranks as the all-time number one holiday single on Billboard's Hot Country Songs chart.
"Blue Christmas"	Hugo Winterhalter and His Orchestra	1949	Peaked at No. 9 on Billboard's Records Most Played by Disk Jockeys chart in the issue dated January 7, 1950. Also made these other Billboard music charts in December 1949 (with peak positions shown): Most-Played Juke Box Records (No. 18) and Best Selling Pop Singles (No. 21). Re-entered Billboard's Most Played by Disk Jockeys chart in December 1950, peaking at No. 20.
"Blue Christmas"	Russ Morgan and His Orchestra	1949	Made these Billboard music charts in December 1949 (with peak positions shown): Best Selling Pop Singles (No. 11), Most-Played Juke Box Records (No. 13), and Records Most Played by Disk Jockeys (No. 18). Vocals by Russ Morgan and The Morganaires.
"Blue Christmas"	Elvis Presley	1957	From the 1957 album Elvis' Christmas Album. First released as a commercial single in 1964. Listed on Billboard's Christmas Singles chart each December from 1964 to 1970, as well as 1972, 1973, and then again from 1983 to 1985, peaking at position No. 1 on this chart on the week ending December 5, 1964, and then again on the week ending December 22, 1973. First entered Billboard's main Hot 100 chart at No. 40 (on the week ending January 5, 2019), and peaked at No. 18 (on the week ending January 6, 2024, following its fourth chart re-entry). Also made these other Billboard music charts (with peak positions shown): Country Airplay (No. 55), Country Digital Song Sales (No. 22), Country Streaming Songs (No. 4), Digital Song Sales (No. 47), Global 200 (No. 26), Global 200 Excl. US (No. 43), Greatest of All Time Holiday 100 Songs (No. 18), Holiday 100 (No. 12), Holiday Airplay (No. 9), Holiday Digital Song Sales (No. 8), Holiday Streaming Songs (No. 9), Hot 100 Recurrents (No. 3), Hot Country Songs (No. 55), LyricFind Global (No. 13), LyricFind U.S. (No. 15), Rock Digital Song Sales (No. 5), Rock Streaming Songs (No. 1), and Streaming Songs (No. 17).
"Blue Christmas"	The Browns featuring Jim Edward Brown	1960	Charted one week on Billboard's Hot 100 chart at No. 97 (week ending December 19, 1960). Features a guitar solo by Chet Atkins.
"Blue Christmas"	Vince Gill	1998	Charted one week on Billboard's Hot Country Singles & Tracks chart at No. 74 (week ending January 9, 1999).
"Blue Christmas"	Clay Walker	2000	Peaked at No. 51 on Billboard's Hot Country Singles & Tracks chart (week ending January 13, 2001).
"Blue Christmas"	Harry Connick, Jr.	2003	Charted one week on Billboard's Adult Contemporary chart at No. 21 (week ending January 3, 2004).
"Blue Christmas"	Elvis Presley with Martina McBride	2008	Virtual duet featuring Presley's archived vocals mixed with McBride's vocals and re-recorded instrumentation. Made these Billboard music charts (with peak positions shown): Adult Contemporary (No. 22), Country Airplay (No. 36), and Hot Country Songs (No. 36).
"Blue December"	Hugo Winterhalter and his Orchestra	1951	Peaked at No. 18 on Billboard's Records Most Played by Disk Jockeys chart in early 1952.
"Blue Holiday"	The Shirelles	1961	Written by Willie Denson and Luther Dixon and recorded by The Shirelles in 1961. Later recorded by Aretha Franklin, and appeared in the 2002 film The Santa Clause 2.
"Blue Lonely Winter"	Jimmy Newman	1967	Peaked at No. 11 on Billboard's Hot Country Singles chart in 1968.
"Blue Winter"	Connie Francis	1964	Peaked at No. 24 on the Billboard Hot 100 singles chart and No. 7 on the Billboard Middle-Road Singles chart in March 1964.
"Boogie Woogie Santa Claus"	Mabel Scott	1948	Peaked at No. 12 on Billboard's Race Records chart. Written by Leon René. Other versions recorded by Patti Page (1950), Inner Voices (1994), Dave Koz (2001), the Brian Setzer Orchestra (2002) and Brenda Russell (2003).
"Breath of Heaven (Mary's Song)"	Amy Grant	1992	From the album Home For Christmas.

== C ==
Title	Artist	Year	Additional information
"Call Me Claus"	Garth Brooks	2001	Peaked at No. 22 on the Billboard Hot 100 sales chart in October 2001, and later reached No. 55 on the Hot Country Singles & Tracks chart in 2002. Title song from the TV movie starring Whoopi Goldberg.
"Candy Cane Children"	The White Stripes	2002	
"Candy Cane Christmas"	Darius Rucker	2009	Peaked at No. 16 on the Billboard Adult Contemporary chart, and No. 32 on the Country chart in 2010. Originally released on the various-artists CD Now That's What I Call Christmas! 4 in 2010, and later on Rucker's 2014 album Home for the Holidays.
"Candy Cane Lane"	Sia	2017	Peaked at No. 28 on the Billboard Holiday Digital Song Sales chart in 2017. From the album Everyday Is Christmas.
"Carol of the Bells"	Fred Waring and His Pennsylvanians	1942	Mykola Leontovych adapted the music from the Ukrainian song "Shchedryk" in 1914. Peter Wilhousky rearranged the melody for orchestra and added lyrics he copywrote in 1936. The song was first made commercially available in a medley on Fred Waring And His Pennsylvanians' 1942 album 'Twas The Night Before Christmas Straight No Chaser's version from their 2008 album Holiday Spirits charted Billboard's Holiday Digital Song Sales survey in 2010. A version by Kim Walker-Smith peaked at No. 13 on Billboard's Adult Contemporary chart in 2014.
"Carol of the Bells"	Ray Conniff and the Ray Conniff Singers	1962	Featured on his popular album We Wish You a Merry Christmas titled as "Ring Christmas Bells". His version peaked at #60 on Billboard's Holiday 100 in 2015.
"Carol of the Bells"	Mannheim Steamroller	1988	Mannheim Steamroller recorded a prog-rock version on their second Christmas studio album A Fresh Aire Christmas. Their version peaked at #44 on Billboard's Holiday Songs chart in 2010.
"Carol of the Bells"	John Williams	1990	Composer John Williams conducted a version for the Home Alone: Original Motion Picture Soundtrack. His version charted at number 86 on Billboard's Greatest of All Time Holiday 100 chart's. It peaked at #47 on the Holiday 100 in 2017.
"Carol of the Bells"	David Foster	1993	The first track on The Christmas Album has charted the highest on the Holiday 100 at #33 in 2008.
"Carol of the Bells"	John Tesh	1997	Peaked at No. 20 on Billboard's Hot Adult Contemporary Tracks chart in 1998.
"Carol of the Bells"	Pentatonix	2012	Featured on their popular album That's Christmas to Me, their A cappella version peaked at #5 in 2013 on Billboard's Holiday Digital Song Sales chart.
"Caroling, Caroling"	Nat King Cole	1960	Written by Alfred Burt & Wihla Hutson. Also recorded by Natalie Cole, Tennessee Ernie Ford, and the King Family.
"Celebrate Me Home"	Kenny Loggins	1977	Title track of Loggins' 1977 debut solo album. Released as a single, the studio version reached No. 64 on the US Record World pop chart in the spring of 1978. A 2015 version by LeAnn Rimes featuring Gavin DeGraw peaked at No. 12 on the Billboard Adult Contemporary chart in 2015.
"Cherry Cherry Christmas"	Neil Diamond	2009	Peaked at No. 4 on Billboard's Adult Contemporary chart. First single released from and title track on Diamond's third holiday album, A Cherry Cherry Christmas.
"Child of God"	Bobby Darin	1960	Peaked at No. 95 on the Billboard Hot 100 singles chart. B-side of Darin's hit single "Christmas Auld Lang Syne".
"Child of Winter"	The Beach Boys	1974	
"Children, Go Where I Send Thee"	Kenny Rogers featuring Home Free	2015	Peaked at No. 21 on Billboard's Hot Christian Songs chart in 2016. Another version by John Oates peaked at No. 29 on Billboard's Adult Contemporary chart in 2017.
"Children's Christmas Song"	The Supremes	1965	Peaked at No. 7 on Billboard's Christmas Singles chart 12/11/1965. Features a children's chorus on backing vocals.
"The Chipmunk Song (Christmas Don't Be Late)"	The Chipmunks	1958	Spent four weeks at No. 1 on the Billboard Hot 100 singles chart in 1958, and reached No. 5 on Billboard's Hot R&B Sides chart in 1959. Written by Ross Bagdasarian (a.k.a. David Seville). The most popular novelty Christmas single in the U.S. through the 1960s. Launched a 50-year music career for the fictional character group.
"C-H-R-I-S-T-M-A-S"	Eddy Arnold, the Tennessee Plowboy and his Guitar	1949	Peaked at No. 7 on Billboard's Country & Western Records Most Played by Folk Disk Jockeys charts. Written by Eddy Arnold & Jenny Lou Carson. Also recorded by the Ames Brothers and Jim Reeves.
"Christmas Ain't Christmas (Without the One You Love)"	The O'Jays	1969	Written and produced by Kenny Gamble and Leon Huff. The song's original title was the longer "(Christmas Ain't Christmas New Year's Ain't New Year's) Without the One You Love". Reissued by the group's record label (Philly International) in 1973 following the group's huge success.
"Christmas All Over Again"	Tom Petty and the Heartbreakers	1992	From the 1992 album A Very Special Christmas 2. Subsequently featured later that year in the 1992 film Home Alone 2: Lost in New York.
"Christmas Alphabet"	The McGuire Sisters	1954	Peaked at No. 25 on the popular records chart. Features orchestration by Dick Jacobs.
"Christmas at Ground Zero"	"Weird Al" Yankovic	1986	
"Christmas at K-Mart"	Root Boy Slim	1978	
"Christmas at the Zoo"	The Flaming Lips	1995	From the album Clouds Taste Metallic. Not intended to be a Christmas song, though the characteristic "jingling bells" are featured in the song, as well as talk of the holiday.
"Christmas Auld Lang Syne"	Bobby Darin	1960	Peaked at No. 51 on the Billboard Hot 100 singles chart in 1961. The B-side "Child of God" also charted for one week in 1960.
"Christmas (Baby Please Come Home)"	Darlene Love	1963	From the 1963 holiday album A Christmas Gift for You from Phil Spector. Written by Phil Spector, Ellie Greenwich, and Jeff Barry. First entered Billboard's Hot 100 chart at No. 50 on the week ending December 29, 2018, peaking at No. 15 on the week ending December 31, 2022 (following its fourth chart re-entry). Also made these other Billboard music charts (with peak positions shown): Global 200 (No. 21), Global 200 Excl. US (No. 34), Greatest of All Time Holiday 100 Songs (No. 31), Holiday 100 (No. 7), Holiday Airplay (No. 18), Holiday Digital Song Sales (No. 21), Holiday Streaming Songs (No. 6), Hot 100 Recurrents (No. 1), LyricFind Global (No. 2), LyricFind U.S. (No. 21), R&B Digital Song Sales (No. 3), R&B Streaming Songs (No. 1), R&B/Hip-Hop Digital Song Sales (No. 7), R&B/Hip-Hop Streaming Songs (No. 1), Streaming Songs (No. 8), and TikTok Top 50 (No. 35).
"Christmas (Baby Please Come Home)"	U2	1987	Released on the 1987 charity album A Very Special Christmas. Peaked at No. 45 on the Billboard Digital Song Sales chart on the week ending January 1, 2005, at No. 29 on the Billboard Rock Digital Song Sales chart on the week ending December 25, 2010, and at No. 30 on the Billboard Holiday Digital Song Sales chart on the week ending January 8, 2011.
"Christmas (Baby Please Come Home)"	Mariah Carey	1994	Peaked at No. 20 on the Billboard Holiday 100 chart and at No. 27 on the Billboard Holiday Airplay chart on the week ending December 29, 2012, at No. 12 on the Billboard Holiday Digital Song Sales chart on the week ending November 26, 2011, and at No. 15 on the Billboard Holiday Streaming Songs chart on the week ending December 28, 2013.
"Christmas Blues"	Canned Heat	1968	Peaked at No. 18 on the Billboard Christmas Singles chart. Also released as a single by The Chipmunks.
"The Christmas Blues"	Dean Martin	1953	Written by David Holt and Sammy Cahn. Also recorded by Jo Stafford.
"Christmas Canon"	Trans-Siberian Orchestra	1998	Chord progression is based on that of Pachelbel's Canon in D major.
"Christmas Can't Be Far Away"	Eddy Arnold and his Guitar	1954	Peaked at No. 12 on Billboard's Country & Western Records Most Played by Jockeys chart in 1955.
"Christmas Can't Be Very Far Away"	Amy Grant	1999	Not to be confused with "Christmas Can't Be Far Away" by Eddy Arnold.
"Christmas Carol"	Skip Ewing	1990	Written in 1986 and first released on Ewing's 1990 album Following Yonder Star. First charted on Billboard's Hot Country Singles & Tracks chart in 1996, peaking at No. 68.
"Christmas Carols by the Old Corral"	Tex Ritter	1945	Peaked at No. 2 on Billboard's Most-Played Juke Box Folk Records chart.
"Christmas Celebration"	B. B. King	1963	First charted on Billboard's Christmas Singles chart in 1964, peaking at No. 25. Charted again in 1967, peaking at No. 17.
"Christmas Children"	David Collings, Richard Beaumont, & Karen Scargill	1970	From the 1970 children's holiday motion picture based on A Christmas Carol by Charles Dickens Scrooge. Featured in the soundtrack composed by Leslie Bricusse.
"Christmas C'mon"	Lindsey Stirling featuring Becky G	2017	Peaked at No. 21 on the Billboard Adult Contemporary chart.
"Christmas (Comes But Once a Year)"	Amos Milburn	1960	Originally released as the B-side of Charles Brown's 1960 holiday hit single, "Please Come Home for Christmas".
"Christmas Cookies"	George Strait	2001	From the 2001 various artists album Christmas Cookies. Peaked at No. 33 on Billboard's Hot Country Singles & Tracks chart in 2002. Originally issued on the Target CD A Country Christmas 1999.
"Christmas Day"	Eddie Fisher	1952	Peaked at No. 22 on the popular records chart. Features Hugo Winterhalter and his orchestra. Written by Benny Davis and Ted Murry. Released within a four-record album set titled Christmas with Eddie Fisher.
"Christmas Dinner"	Tennessee Ernie Ford	1951	B-side is "A Rootin' Tootin' Santa Claus".
"Christmas Dragnet (Parts I & II)"	Stan Freberg with Daws Butler	1953	Peaked at No. 13 on Billboard's Best Selling Singles chart. A parody of Dragnet and the follow-up to Freberg's No. 1 hit from several months earlier, "St. George and the Dragonet". In 1954, the same record was re-issued under the title "Yulenet (Parts I & II)".
"Christmas Dream"	Perry Como	1974	Peaked at No. 92 on the Billboard Hot 100 singles chart. From the 1974 film The Odessa File. Como's last appearance on the Billboard Hot 100.
"Christmas Dreaming (A Little Early This Year)"	Frank Sinatra	1947	Peaked at No. 26 on the Billboard Pop Charts. Featuring the Axel Stordahl orchestra.
"Christmas Eve"	Kelly Clarkson	2017	Peaked at No. 2 on the Billboard Adult Contemporary chart in early 2018.
"Christmas Eve in My Hometown"	Bobby Vinton	1970	Earlier recordings by Eddie Fisher and Kate Smith.
"Christmas Eve/Sarajevo 12/24"	Savatage	1996	The song is a medley including "God Rest Ye Merry, Gentlemen" and a hard rock version of "Carol of the Bells". First released in 1995 on the Savatage album Dead Winter Dead, but the same recording was re-released in 1996 as a track on the Trans-Siberian Orchestra album Christmas Eve and Other Stories.
"A Christmas Festival (Part One)"	Leroy Anderson and His "Pops" Concert Orchestra	1952	Peaked at No. 22 on the pop singles chart on the week of January 3, 1953. Famous medley of nine songs arranged by Anderson: "Joy to the World"/"Deck the Halls"/"God Rest Ye Merry, Gentlemen"/"Good King Wenceslas"/"Hark! The Herald Angels Sing"/"The First Noel"/"Silent Night"/"Jingle Bells"/O Come, All Ye Faithful".
"Christmas for Cowboys"	John Denver	1975	From the album Rocky Mountain Christmas. Written by Steve Weisberg. Peaked at No. 58 on the Billboard Hot 100 chart.
"Christmas Goose (Snowbird)"	Stan & Doug 'Yust Go Nuts at Christmas'	1970	Peaked at No. 7 on Billboard's Christmas Singles chart on the week ending December 26, 1970. A parody of the hit song "Snowbird," popularized by Anne Murray.
"Christmas in America"	Pat Benatar	2001	Reached No. 22 on the Billboard Adult Contemporary chart and No. 37 on the Billboard Hot Singles Sales chart. Later appeared on the 2003 album Go as a hidden track.
"Christmas in Dixie"	Alabama	1982	The original version featured Alabama wishing you "Merry Christmas" near the end of the song. Lead singer Randy Owen re-recorded the song with Kenny Chesney in 2003.
"Christmas in Hollis"	Run-D.M.C.	1987	An original song written and recorded by the group for charity, with the music video a perennial favorite on the MTV through the late 1980s and 1990s. It first appeared on two 1987 various artist holiday compilation albums: A Very Special Christmas and Christmas Rap, with the former album to benefit the Special Olympics. The track samples the 1968 soul tune "Back Door Santa" by Clarence Carter.
"Christmas in Killarney"	Dennis Day	1950	Featuring the Mellowmen on backing vocals and instrumentation by the Henri René Orchestra. Another hit version was by Percy Faith and the Shillelagh Singers in 1950. Also recorded on successful Christmas albums by Bing Crosby, Bobby Vinton and Anne Murray.
"Christmas in My Hometown"	Sonny James	1954	Covered by Travis Tritt in 1992
"Christmas in My Home Town"	Charley Pride	1970	Peaked at No. 11 on the Billboard Christmas Singles chart.
"Christmas in New Orleans"	Louis Armstrong with the Benny Carter Orchestra	1955	
"Christmas in the Caribbean"	Jimmy Buffett	1985	
"Christmas in the City"	Elizabeth Chan	2014	Peaked at No. 29 on the Billboard Adult Contemporary chart in 2015.
"Christmas in Your Arms"	Steve Wariner	2000	Peaked at No. 65 on the Billboard Hot Country Songs chart.
"Christmas Is" (1)	Percy Faith	1966	Written by Percy Faith and Spencer Maxwell. Originally recorded by Percy Faith in 1964 as an instrumental ("Judy"). Selected as the theme song for the 1967 Christmas Seals appeal. Also a hit that year for Lou Rawls.
"Christmas Is" (2)	Jim Brickman featuring Mark Masri	2008	Peaked at No. 18 on the Billboard Hot Adult Contemporary Tracks chart during the Christmas season of 2008.
"Christmas Is for Children"	Glen Campbell	1968	Written by Sammy Cahn and Jimmy Van Heusen, with orchestration by Al De Lory. Peaked at No. 7 on Billboard's Christmas Singles survey on the week ending December 21, 1968.
"Christmas Is Going to the Dogs"	Eels	2000	From the 2000 film How the Grinch Stole Christmas.
"Christmas Is Just a Song for Us This Year"	Louise Mandrell and R.C. Bannon	1982	B-side of "Christmas in Dixie" by Alabama. Reached No. 35 on the Hot Country Singles chart in 1982.
"Christmas Is Just Around the Corner"	Barry Manilow	2008	Reached No. 16 on the Billboard Hot Adult Contemporary Tracks chart.
"Christmas Is Now Drawing Near at Hand"	Steve Winwood	1997	From the album A Very Special Christmas 3.
"Christmas is the Time to Say 'I Love You'"	Billy Squier	1981	Originally released as the B-side of Squier's 1981 single "My Kinda Lover". Peaked at #9 on Billboard's Christmas chart 12/15/1984.
"Christmas Island"	The Andrews Sisters with Guy Lombardo and His Royal Canadians	1946	Peaked at No. 7 on the Billboard Pop charts in 1946. Re-charted in 1947 and 1949. Also a hit for Jimmy Buffett (1996), and The Brian Setzer Orchestra (2005).
"Christmas Isn't Canceled (Just You)"	Kelly Clarkson	2021	Peaked at No. 7 on the Billboard Adult Contemporary charts in 2001, as well as No. 64 on the Holiday 100 and No. 79 on the Hot 100.
"Christmas Kisses"	The Bookends	1961	With the Ray Anthony orchestra.
"Christmas Lights"	Coldplay	2010	Digital download track that peaked at No. 25 on the Billboard Hot 100 and No. 12 on the Billboard Hot Digital Songs chart.
"A Christmas Love"	Johnny Kaye with the Morty Jay Orchestra	1963	Charted for 1 week on the Christmas Singles chart, peaking at No. 20.
"Christmas Lullaby"	Cary Grant	1967	Written by Peggy Lee and Cy Coleman.
"Christmas Medley" (1)	Liberace	1953	Peaked at No. 21 on the pop singles chart on the week of December 26, 1953. Medley of four songs: "White Christmas"/"Jingle Bells"/"O Come, All Ye Faithful (Adeste Fideles)"/"Silent Night, Holy Night".
"Christmas Medley" (2)	The Salsoul Orchestra	1976	A 12-minute, 8-second disco medley of holiday songs performed by the backing band for Salsoul Records, containing the songs: "Joy To The World"/"Deck The Halls"/"O Come All Ye Faithful"/"Jingle Bells"/"Hark! The Herald Angels Sing"/"Santa Claus Is Coming To Town"/"The Christmas Song"/"White Christmas"/"Rudolph The Red-Nosed Reindeer"/"I'll Be Home For Christmas"/"Winter Wonderland"/"The First Noël"/"We Wish You A Merry Christmas". The B-side of the single was "New Year's Medley", a 7-minute, 17-second medley of new year's-related songs.
"Christmas Memories"	Frank Sinatra	1975	Also recorded by Alabama (1985), Steve Wariner (1992), Rosemary Clooney (1996), and Barbra Streisand (2001). Sometimes titled "Christmas Mem'ries".
"Christmas Must Be Tonight"	The Band	1977	From the album Islands. Written by band member Robbie Robertson, who recorded a solo version in 1988 for the soundtrack to the film Scrooged.
"Christmas Night in Harlem"	Louis Armstrong with the Benny Carter Orchestra.	1955	Song originated in 1934. A hit, in that year, by the Paul Whiteman orchestra.
"Christmas Party"	"Two Ton" Baker the Merry Music Maker	1948	Issued as a 2-disc (in a foldout picture sleeve) 78 rpm set on Mercury Records' Miniature Playhouse children's series (songs on the set are "The Night Before Christmas"/"Santa's Toy Shop"/"Up on the House Top"/"Deck The Halls"/"Jingle Bells").
"Christmas Rappin'"	Kurtis Blow	1979	Charted on the Billboard R&B chart in 1993, 1994, 1996 and 2000.
"Christmas Saves the Year"	Twenty One Pilots	2020	
"The Christmas Shoes"	NewSong	2000	Spent one week at No. 1 on the Billboard Adult Contemporary chart, and also peaked at No. 42 on the Billboard Hot 100 chart and No. 31 on the Hot Country Songs chart. From the album Sheltering Tree.
"Christmas Shopping"	Buck Owens and his Buckaroos	1968	From Owens' album of the same name. Reached No. 5 on the Billboard Christmas chart.
"Christmas Song"	Dave Matthews Band	2000	
"The Christmas Song"	Angel	1977	A version of the rock band's own 1977 hit "The Winter Song", but featuring alternate lyrics (both tracks featured The California Boys Choir and both were produced by Eddie Leonetti).
"The Christmas Song (Merry Christmas to You)"	The King Cole Trio	1946	Written in 1944 by Mel Tormé and Robert Wells. Sometimes subtitled "Chestnuts Roasting on an Open Fire", but originally subtitled "Merry Christmas to You." Peaked at No. 3 on both the Billboard Records Most-Played On The Air and Juke Box Race Records charts in December 1946.
"The Christmas Song (Merry Christmas to You)"	Nat King Cole	1953	With orchestra conducted by Nelson Riddle (Capitol 3561). First entered the Billboard Hot 100 chart on the week ending December 12, 1960, peaking at No. 65 on the week ending December 29, 1962.
"The Christmas Song (Merry Christmas to You)"	Nat King Cole	1961	Recorded in stereo for the first time with orchestra conducted by Ralph Carmichael; this final Cole version has charted on Billboard's Hot 100 every year since 2013 (with the exception of 2014), peaking at No. 9 on the week ending January 7, 2023. Also made these other Billboard music charts (with peak positions shown): Adult Contemporary (No. 16), Adult R&B Airplay (No. 40), Digital Song Sales (No. 8), Global 200 (No. 15), Global 200 Excl. US (No. 25), Greatest of All Time Holiday 100 Songs (No. 4), Holiday 100 (No. 2), Holiday Airplay (No. 1), Holiday Digital Song Sales (No. 3), Holiday Streaming Songs (No. 2), Hot 100 Recurrents (No. 1), LyricFind Global (No. 1), LyricFind U.S. (No. 2), Radio Songs (No. 26), R&B Digital Song Sales (No. 1), R&B Streaming Songs (No. 1), R&B/Hip-Hop Digital Song Sales (No. 1), R&B/Hip-Hop Streaming Songs (No. 1), and Streaming Songs (No. 5). It remains the most popular version of the song.
"The Christmas Song (Merry Christmas to You)"	Les Brown and His Orchestra	1946	Featuring Doris Day on vocal. Debuted and peaked at No. 12 on the Billboard Records Most-Played On The Air chart in January 1947.
"The Christmas Song (Merry Christmas to You)"	James Brown & The Famous Flames	1966	Peaked at No. 12 on the Billboard Best Selling Christmas Singles chart on the week ending December 17, 1966.
"The Christmas Song (Merry Christmas to You)"	Herb Alpert	1968	Spent three weeks at No. 1 on the Billboard Christmas Singles chart in December 1968.
"The Christmas Song (Merry Christmas to You)"	Natalie Cole	1991	Peaked at No. 22 on the Billboard Hot Adult Contemporary chart on the week ending January 4, 1992.
"The Christmas Song (Merry Christmas to You)"	Toni Braxton	1993	Peaked at No. 57 on the Billboard Hot R&B Airplay chart on the week ending January 8, 1994.
"The Christmas Song (Merry Christmas to You)"	Reba McEntire	1996	Peaked at No. 63 on the Billboard Hot Country Singles & Tracks chart on the week ending January 11, 1997.
"The Christmas Song (Merry Christmas to You)"	Trace Adkins	1998	Peaked at No. 64 on the Billboard Hot Country Singles & Tracks chart on the week ending January 2, 1999.
"The Christmas Song (Merry Christmas to You)"	Martina McBride	1998	Peaked at No. 67 on the Billboard Hot Country Singles & Tracks chart on the week ending December 30, 2000.
"The Christmas Song (Merry Christmas to You)"	Christina Aguilera	1999	Peaked at No. 18 on the Billboard Hot 100 chart on the week ending January 1, 2000. First version of the song to make the Top 40 portion of the Hot 100 chart.
"The Christmas Song (Merry Christmas to You)"	Michael Bublé	2003	Peaked at No. 6 on the Billboard Adult Contemporary chart on the week ending December 20, 2003.
"The Christmas Song (Merry Christmas to You)"	Lauren Daigle	2018	Peaked at No. 33 on the Billboard Holiday 100 and #55 on the Hot 100 in 2019.
"Christmas Spirit"	Richard Marx	2011	Peaked at No. 15 on Billboard's Adult Contemporary chart on the week ending January 7, 2012. Written by Marx and Fee Waybill, this is the title track of Marx's 2012 holiday album.
"Christmas Spirits"	Julia Lee and Her Boy Friends	1948	Peaked at No. 14 on Billboard's Best-Selling Retail Race Records chart on the week of January 8, 1949.
"Christmas Tears"	Freddy King	1961	Debuted and peaked at No. 26 on Billboard's Hot R&B Sides chart on the week of December 25, 1961; also debuted and peaked at No. 12 on Billboard's Christmas Singles chart on the week ending December 12, 1964.
"Christmas Through Your Eyes"	Gloria Estefan	1992	Reached the British pop singles chart in 1992 as a double-A side with "Miami Hit Mix". From the album Christmas Through Your Eyes.
"Christmas Time" (1)	Bryan Adams	1985	Peaked at No. 4 on Billboard's Christmas Singles chart on the week ending December 28, 1985; also peaked at No. 31 on Billboard's Top Rock Tracks chart on the week ending January 11, 1986. The single was issued with a different picture sleeve in 1986.
"Christmas Time" (2)	John Anderson	1994	Peaked at No. 57 on Billboard's Hot Country Singles & Tracks chart on the week ending January 7, 1995.
"Christmas Time (Is Here Again)"	The Beatles	1967	Also recorded by group member Ringo Starr for his 1999 Christmas album I Wanna Be Santa Claus.
"Christmas Time Again"	Jolly Demis	1988	Demis customized the song as a holiday jingle for numerous American television stations, beginning in Denver, and eventually reaching St. Louis and Phoenix, among many smaller markets. WIVB-TV in Buffalo, New York has had a particularly long-running association with their version of the song ("Happy Holidays from Channel 4"), which has been played since 1993 and is Demis's personal favorite.
"Christmas Time Is Here" (1)	Vince Guaraldi Trio	1965	Composed and recorded for the soundtrack to the 1965 animated holiday television special, A Charlie Brown Christmas (both instrumental and vocal versions of the song recorded by Guaraldi and included on the soundtrack album). Vocal version entered Billboard's Holiday 100 chart at No. 32 (on the week ending December 10, 2011), peaking at No. 17 (on the week ending January 17, 2017). Vocal version also entered Billboard's main Hot 100 chart at No. 48 (on the week ending January 1, 2022), peaking at No. 23 (on the week ending January 3, 2026, following its fourth chart re-entry). Vocal version also made these other Billboard music charts (with peak positions shown): Digital Song Sales (No. 40), Global 200 (No. 41), Global 200 Excl. US (No. 118), Greatest of All Time Holiday 100 Songs (No. 27), Holiday Airplay (No. 30), Holiday Digital Song Sales (No. 10), Holiday Streaming Songs (No. 10), LyricFind Global (No. 23), LyricFind U.S. (No. 10), On-Demand Streaming Songs (No. 22), and Streaming Songs (No. 22). Instrumental version both entered and peaked at No. 68 on Billboard's Digital Song Sales chart (on the week ending December 24, 2005). Melody has similar chord progression to the 1932 Cole Porter jazz standard, "Night and Day."
"Christmas Time Is Here" (1)	Toni Braxton	2001	Debuted and peaked at No. 11 on Billboard's Holiday Airplay chart on the week ending December 8, 2001.
"Christmas Time Is Here" (2)	Ray Parker Jr.	1982	Re-issued in 1984 as the B-side of Parker's top 40 pop hit single, "Jamie".
"Christmas Time's A-Comin'"	Sammy Kershaw	1994	Peaked at No. 50 on Billboard's Hot Country Singles & Tracks chart on the week ending January 7, 1995; re-charted in January 1998 (peaking at No. 53). Originally recorded and released in 1951 by Bill Monroe and His Blue Grass Boys, with a melody strongly based on the 19th century folk song "Skip to My Lou."
"Christmas Tonight"	Dave Barnes with Hillary Scott	2010	Reached No. 9 on the Billboard Hot Adult Contemporary Tracks chart.
"Christmas Tree" (1)	Lady Gaga featuring Space Cowboy	2008	Entered Billboard's Holiday Digital Song Sales chart on the week ending October 16, 2010, peaking at No. 15 on the week ending January 15, 2011.
"Christmas Tree" (2)	V	2021	Debuted and peaked at No. 79 on Billboard's Hot 100 chart and at No. 54 on Billboard's Holiday 100 chart on the week ending January 8, 2022. Also made these other Billboard music charts (with peak positions shown): Digital Song Sales (No. 1), Global 200 (No. 51), Global 200 Excl. US (No. 43), and Holiday Digital Song Sales (No. 1).
"Christmas Tree Farm"	Taylor Swift	2019	Written and co-produced by Swift. Debuted and peaked at No. 59 on Billboard's Hot 100 chart and at No. 19 on Billboard's Holiday 100 chart on the week ending December 21, 2019. Also made these other Billboard music charts (with peak positions shown): Adult Contemporary (No. 3), Adult Pop Airplay (No. 40), Digital Song Sales (No. 2), Global 200 (No. 84), Global 200 Excl. US (No. 106), Holiday Digital Song Sales (No. 2), Holiday Streaming Songs (No. 44), LyricFind Global (No. 24), and LyricFind U.S. (No. 20).
"Christmas Tree Farm"	Taylor Swift	2021	Updated recording of the song by Swift (referred to as the "Old Timey Version"). First entered Billboard's main Hot 100 chart on the week ending December 11, 2021, peaking at No. 62 on the week ending January 1, 2022. First entered Billboard's Holiday 100 chart on the week ending December 4, 2021, peaking at No. 46 on the week ending January 1, 2022. Also made these other Billboard music charts (with peak positions shown): Adult Contemporary (No. 22), Global 200 (No. 98), Holiday Digital Song Sales (No. 10), Holiday Streaming Songs (No. 40), and Streaming Songs (No. 48).
"A Christmas Tribute"	Bob Luman	1977	Peaked at No. 92 on Billboard's Hot Country Singles chart on the week ending January 7, 1978.
"Christmas Vacation"	Mavis Staples	1989	From the 1989 film National Lampoon's Christmas Vacation. Written by Barry Mann and Cynthia Weil.
"The Christmas Waltz"	Harry Connick, Jr.	2003	Hit the Adult Contemporary chart in 2004. Previously recorded by Frank Sinatra in 1954, 1957, and 1968, as well as Kay Starr, Nancy Wilson, The Carpenters, Lawrence Welk, Natalie Cole, and Barry Manilow.
"Christmas Where You Are"	Five for Fighting featuring Jim Brickman	2017	Peaked at No. 11 on the Billboard Adult Contemporary chart in early 2018.
"Christmas Will Be Just Another Lonely Day"	Brenda Lee	1964	B-side to her single "This Time of the Year". Charted for 1 week in 1964.
"A Christmas Wish"	Bobby Goldsboro	1968	Reached No. 11 in Billboard's Christmas singles chart. B-side is "Look Around You (It's Christmas Time)".
"Christmas with the Devil"	Spinal Tap	1984	Written by Christopher Guest, Michael McKean & Harry Shearer. Originally issued on Enigma Records with picture sleeve and also a special picture disc issue, both 7"
"Christmas Without You"	Kenny Rogers and Dolly Parton	1984	From the album Once Upon a Christmas.
"Christmas Won't Be the Same This Year"	The Jackson 5	1970	Peaked at No. 2 on Billboard's Christmas Singles chart on the week ending December 26, 1970. Flip side of The Jackson 5's recording of "Santa Claus Is Comin' to Town".
"Christmas Wrapping"	The Waitresses	1981	From the 1981 various artists holiday compilation album A Christmas Record on ZE Records. Peaked at No. 67 on Billboard's Holiday 100 chart on the week ending December 8, 2018. Also made these other Billboard music charts (with peak positions shown): Alternative Digital Song Sales (No. 2), Digital Song Sales (No. 48), Holiday Digital Song Sales (No. 12), Rock Digital Song Sales (No. 6), and Rock Streaming Songs (No. 17).
"Christmastime" (1)	Aimee Mann with Michael Penn	1996	From the album Just Say Noël. Also used in the film Hard Eight.
"Christmastime" (2)	The Smashing Pumpkins	1997	An original song written by Billy Corgan and released on the compilation A Very Special Christmas 3 in aid of the Special Olympics.
"The Closing of the Year"	The Musical Cast of Toys featuring Wendy & Lisa	1992	Peaked at No. 53 on Billboard's Hot 100 Airplay chart and at No. 37 on Billboard's Adult Contemporary chart. Main theme song of the 1992 film Toys.
"Cold"	John Gary	1967	Peaked at No. 1 for two weeks on Billboard's Adult Contemporary chart in December 1967.
"Cold Cold Winter"	The Pixies Three	1963	Peaked at No. 79 on Billboard's Hot 100 singles chart in early January 1964.
"Cold December Night"	Michael Bublé	2011	Peaked at No. 10 on Billboard's Adult Contemporary chart in 2012.
"Colorado Christmas"	Nitty Gritty Dirt Band	1983	Peaked at No. 92 on Billboard's Hot Country Singles chart in January 1984. Guest vocals by Emmylou Harris.
"Coming Home for Christmas"	Jim Brickman	2007	Peaked at No. 4 on the Billboard Hot Adult Contemporary Tracks chart during the Christmas season of 2007. Features Richie McDonald (former lead singer of Lonestar) on lead vocals.
"Cool Yule"	Louis Armstrong with the Commanders	1953	Written by Steve Allen. Also a hit remake for singer/actress Bette Midler in 2006.
"Coventry Carol"	Robert Shaw	1949	Christmas carol dating from the 16th century.
"Cozy Little Christmas"	Katy Perry	2018	Written and produced by Perry, Greg Wells and Ferras Alqaisi. Debuted on Billboard's main Hot 100 chart on the week ending December 29, 2018, peaking at No. 53 one week later. Peaked at No. 1 for one week on Billboard's Adult Contemporary chart on the week ending December 29, 2018. Also made these other Billboard music charts (with peak positions shown): Adult Pop Airplay (No. 37), Bubbling Under Hot 100 (No. 2), Global 200 (No. 76), Global 200 Excl. US (No. 108), Greatest of All Time Holiday 100 Songs (No. 79), Holiday 100 (No. 30), Holiday Digital Song Sales (No. 19), Holiday Streaming Songs (No. 24), Hot 100 Recurrents (No. 9), and Streaming Songs (No. 39). Also peaked at No. 26 on Rolling Stone's Top 100 Songs chart in December 2019.
"A Crosby Christmas" (Parts 1 & 2)	Gary, Phillip, Dennis, Lindsay and Bing Crosby	1950	Both debuted and peaked at No. 22 on Billboard's Best Selling Pop Singles chart in December 1950. Features Bing Crosby's sons Gary, Lindsay, and twins Phillip & Dennis Crosby, along with backing by the Jeff Alexander Chorus and the John Scott Trotter Orchestra. Medley of "That Christmas Feeling"/"I'd Like to Hitch a Ride with Santa Claus"/"The Snowman."

== D ==
Title	Artist	Year	Additional information
"Daddy's Drinking Up Our Christmas"	Commander Cody	1973	Peaked at No. 19 on the Billboard Christmas Singles chart.
"Dance of the Sugar Plum Fairy"	Pentatonix	2014	The piece of music is the third movement from The Nutcracker. Featured on Pentatonix's album That's Christmas to Me, it peaked at No. 27 on the Billboard Holiday 100.
"Dearest Santa"	Bobby Vinton	1964	Peaked at No. 8 on the Billboard Christmas Singles chart, and released with the B-side "The Bell That Couldn't Jingle" Also issued with the hit song "Mr. Lonely", as a back-to-back promotional single with a text sleeve. From the album A Very Merry Christmas.
"December"	Earth, Wind & Fire	2014	Other than a change in the song's setting from September 21 to December 25, the song is a note-for-note, word-for-word remake of their 1978 hit "September." From their album Holiday, which reached No. 26 on the Billboard Top R&B/Hip Hop Albums and No. 8 on the Billboard Holiday Albums charts.
"December, 1963 (Oh, What a Night)"	The Four Seasons	1975	Released during the 1975 Christmas season and reached No. 1 on the Billboard Hot 100 in March 1976. It again charted at No. 14 on the same chart in 1994. Songwriter Bob Gaudio produced a 2005 remake for the musical Jersey Boys, with Daniel Reichard singing lead, with additional dialogue (written by Marshall Brickman and Rick Elice and recited by J. Robert Spencer) confirming the song's implied Christmas setting.
"December Prayer"	Idina Menzel	2014	From the album Holiday Wishes.
"Deck the Halls"	Nat King Cole	1960	From Cole's 1960 album The Magic of Christmas. First entered Billboard's Hot 100 chart at No. 47 on the week ending December 26, 2020, peaking at No. 16 on the week ending December 31, 2022 (following its second chart re-entry). Also made these other Billboard music charts (with peak positions shown): Global 200 (No. 31), Global 200 Excl. US (No. 68), Greatest of All Time Holiday 100 Songs (No. 63), Holiday 100 (No. 13), Holiday Airplay (No. 36), Holiday Streaming Songs (No. 12), Hot 100 Recurrents (No. 2), R&B Streaming Songs (No. 3), R&B/Hip-Hop Streaming Songs (No. 4), and Streaming Songs (No. 13).
"Deck the Halls"	Mannheim Steamroller	1984	From the 1984 album Mannheim Steamroller Christmas. Peaked at No. 38 on Billboard's Hot Adult Contemporary chart (week ending January 7, 1995), at No. 10 on Billboard's Holiday Airplay chart (week ending December 22, 2001), and at No. 91 on Billboard's Holiday 100 chart (week ending December 13, 2014).
"Deck the Halls"	SHeDAISY	1999	From the 1999 animated movie Mickey's Once Upon a Christmas. Peaked at No. 61 on Billboard's Hot 100 chart (week ending January 8, 2000) and at No. 37 on Billboard's Hot Country Singles & Tracks chart (week ending January 6, 2001).
"Deck the Halls"	Brian Wilson	2005	From the 2005 album What I Really Want for Christmas. Peaked at No. 8 on Billboard's Adult Contemporary chart on the week ending January 7, 2006.
"Deck the Halls/The Twelve Days of Christmas"	Kenny G	2002	Medley of two ancient Welsh and English folk carols. From the 2002 album Wishes: A Holiday Album. Peaked at No. 22 on Billboard's Adult Contemporary chart on the week ending January 4, 2003.
"Dig That Crazy Santa Claus"	Ralph Marterie & His Orchestra	1954	Also recorded by Oscar McLollie & His Honey Jumpers in 1954, and The Brian Setzer Orchestra in 2005.
"Ding Dong, Ding Dong"	George Harrison	1974	Peaked at No. 36 on the Billboard Hot 100 singles chart in February 1975.
"DJ Play a Christmas Song"	Cher	2023	Peaked at No. 1 for four consecutive weeks on Billboard's Adult Contemporary chart in December 2023. Also made these other Billboard music charts (with peak positions shown): Bubbling Under Hot 100 (No. 15), Dance/Electronic Digital Song Sales (No. 1), Dance/Electronic Streaming Songs (No. 1), Digital Song Sales (No. 5), Global 200 (No. 93), Global 200 Excl. US (No. 79), Holiday 100 (No. 82), Holiday Digital Song Sales (No. 1), Hot 100 (No. 90), Hot Dance/Electronic Songs (No. 3), LyricFind Global (No. 17), and Pop Airplay (No. 40).
"Do They Know It's Christmas?"	Band Aid	1984	A benefit recording by an all-star group to assist famine relief in Ethiopia; organized by Bob Geldof of the British rock band The Boomtown Rats. Written by Geldof and Midge Ure of the British rock band Ultravox. A Christmas No. 1 single on the UK singles chart in 1984, and re-recorded on two other separate occasions: Band Aid II in 1989 and Band Aid 20 in 2004.
"Do They Know It's Christmas?"	Glee Cast	2011	Record for the Glee season 3 episode "Extraordinary Merry Christmas". Peaked at No.92 on the Hot 100
"Do You Hear What I Hear?"	Bing Crosby	1963	Peaked at No. 2 on Billboard's Christmas Singles chart in December 1963. Features backing by Ralph Carmichael's chorus and orchestra. Originally recorded by the Harry Simeone Chorale in 1962, which peaked at No. 66 on the Music Vendor survey.
"Do You Hear What I Hear?"	Andy Williams	1965	Peaked at No. 18 on Billboard's Christmas Singles chart in December 1965.
"Do You Hear What I Hear?"	Whitney Houston	1987	From the original A Very Special Christmas album. Peaked at No. 1 on the Billboard Gospel Digital Songs for 42 weeks in 2011 following Houston's death, a record for that chart. A remix of Houston's vocal with the instruments replaced with Pentatonix's a cappella vocal harmonies reached No. 9 on the Adult Contemporary chart.
"Do You Hear What I Hear?"	Vanessa Williams	1996	Peaked at No. 15 on Billboard's Adult Contemporary chart in January 1997.
"Do You Hear What I Hear?"	Carrie Underwood	2007	Peaked at No. 2 for three consecutive weeks on Billboard's Adult Contemporary chart in December 2007, at No. 27 on Billboard's Hot Country Songs chart in January 2008, and at No. 90 on Billboard's Hot 100 chart in January 2008. Also made these other Billboard music charts (with peak positions shown): Country Streaming Songs (No. 18), Holiday 100 (No. 50), Holiday Airplay (No. 17), Holiday Digital Song Sales (No. 23), and Radio Songs (No. 53).
"Do You Hear What I Hear?"	Carole King	2011	Peaked at No. 14 on Billboard's Adult Contemporary chart in January 2012.
"Do You Hear What I Hear?"	Jordin Sparks	2012	Peaked at No. 7 on Billboard's Adult Contemporary chart and at No. 48 on Billboard's Holiday Airplay chart in December 2012. A note-for-note remake of Whitney Houston's version of the song.
"Do You Hear What I Hear?"	Russell Watson	2016	Peaked at No. 16 on Billboard's Adult Contemporary chart in late December 2017 and early January 2018.
"Dominick the Donkey (The Italian Christmas Donkey)"	Lou Monte	1960	Featuring orchestration by Joe Reisman. Peaked at No. 114 on the Billboard Bubbling Under Hot 100 Singles chart.
"¿Dónde Está Santa Claus? (Where Is Santa Claus?)"	Augie Rios	1958	Featuring orchestration by Mark Jeffrey. Peaked at No. 47 on the Billboard Hot 100 singles chart. Also covered by actress Charo (1978), and by the rock band Guster (2003).
"Don't Save It All for Christmas Day"	Celine Dion	1998	Christian group Avalon covered the song for their 2000 album Joy: A Christmas Collection. Clay Aiken also covered it for his 2004 Christmas collection Merry Christmas with Love.
"Don't Shoot Me Santa"	The Killers	2007	Peaked at No. 58 on the Billboard Hot Digital Songs chart and No. 73 on the Pop 100.
"(Don't Wait 'Till) The Night Before Christmas"	Eddy Duchin and his Orchestra	1938	Featuring vocals by Stanley Worth. Peaked at No. 9 on the pop singles chart.
"Dreams of Fireflies (On a Christmas Night)"	Trans-Siberian Orchestra	2012	Peaked at No. 3 on Billboard's Adult Contemporary chart. From the five-song EP of the same name.

== E ==
Title	Artist	Year	Additional information
"Early Christmas Morning"	Cyndi Lauper	1998	From the album Merry Christmas...Have a Nice Life
"Easier Said Than Done"	Jon Anderson	1986	Written by Vangelis. From Jon's Christmas album 3 Ships.
"8 Days of Christmas"	Destiny's Child	2001	Peaked at No. 57 on the Billboard Hot R&B/Hip-Hop Singles & Tracks chart, and at No. 102 on the Billboard Bubbling Under Hot 100 Singles chart in 2002.
"Elf's Lament"	Barenaked Ladies featuring Michael Bublé	2004	
"Even Santa Claus Gets the Blues"	Marty Stuart	2003	Peaked at No. 55 on the Billboard Hot Country Singles & Tracks chart in 2004. From the album A Very Special Acoustic Christmas.
"Every Year, Every Christmas"	Luther Vandross	1995	Peaked at No. 32 on the Billboard Hot R&B Airplay chart in 1996.
"(Everybody's Waitin' for) The Man with the Bag"	Kay Starr	1950	Written by Irving Taylor, Dudley Brooks, and Hal Stanley. Also recorded by Vonda Shepard (2000), The Brian Setzer Orchestra (2002), Jane Monheit (2005), and Kellie Pickler (2013).
"Everyday Will Be Like a Holiday"	William Bell	1967	Peaked at No. 33 on Billboard's Best Selling R&B Singles chart in late January and early February 1968. Covered by the Sweet Inspirations in 1969, and by Daryl Hall & John Oates in 2006.

== F ==
Title	Artist	Year	Additional information
"Fa La La"	Jim Brickman featuring Olivia Jade Archbold	2011	Peaked at No. 2 on the Billboard Adult Contemporary Tracks chart.
"Fall Softly Snow"	Jim Ed Brown and Helen Cornelius	1977	Reached #91 on the Billboard Hot Country Singles chart.
"Far Away Blues (Xmas Blues)"	Johnny Otis Orchestra with Little Esther and Mel Walker	1950	Peaked at No. 6 on Billboard's Best Selling Retail Rhythm & Blues Records chart in December 1950.
"Father Christmas"	The Kinks	1977	Written by Ray Davies of the Kinks.
"Favorite Time of Year"	India Arie & Joe Sample featuring Tori Kelly	2015	Peaked at No. 24 on the Billboard Adult Contemporary chart.
"Feliz Navidad"	José Feliciano	1970	Written by Feliciano. Debuted and peaked at No. 71 on Cashbox's Top 100 Singles chart on the week ending December 26, 1970. First entered Billboard's Adult Contemporary chart on the week ending January 3, 1998, peaking at No. 12 on the week ending January 8, 2000 (upon its chart re-entry). First entered Billboard's Holiday 100 chart on the week ending December 10, 2011, peaking at No. 3 on the week ending January 7, 2012. First entered Billboard's main Hot 100 chart at No. 44 on the week ending January 7, 2017, peaking at No. 6 on the week ending January 2, 2021 (following its fourth chart re-entry). Also made these other Billboard music charts (with peak positions shown): Adult Pop Airplay (No. 35), Bubbling Under Hot 100 (No. 5), Digital Song Sales (No. 19), Global 200 (No. 5), Global 200 Excl. US (No. 7), Greatest of All Time Holiday 100 Songs (No. 6), Holiday Airplay (No. 1), Holiday Digital Song Sales (No. 4), Holiday Streaming Songs (No. 7), Hot 100 Recurrents (No. 1), Hot Latin Songs (No. 29), Latin Airplay (No. 29), Latin Digital Song Sales (No. 1), Latin Pop Airplay (No. 28), Latin Streaming Songs (No. 1), LyricFind Global (No. 3), LyricFind US (No. 2), Radio Songs (No. 12), Streaming Songs (No. 7), and TikTok Top 50 (No. 8).
"Feliz Navidad"	Clay Walker	2002	Peaked at No. 49 on the Billboard Hot Country Singles & Tracks chart on the week ending January 11, 2003.
"Feliz Navidad"	Jon Secada	2005	Peaked at No. 3 on the Billboard Adult Contemporary chart on the week ending January 7, 2006.
"The First Christmas"	Danny Thomas	1967	With the Sid Feller orchestra. From the Rankin/Bass animated special The Cricket on the Hearth. Peaked at #24 on Billboard's "Best Bets For Christmas" survey.
"The First Noel"	Clay Aiken	2003	Contemporary version of the traditional English Christmas carol that peaked at No. 9 on the Billboard's Hot Adult Contemporary Tracks chart.
"The First Noel"	Carrie Underwood	2008	Peaked at No. 50 on Billboard's Hot Country Songs chart in January 2009 and at No. 36 on Billboard's Holiday Digital Song Sales chart in December 2012.
"Footprints in the Snow"	Bill Monroe and his Blue Grass Boys	1946	Peaked at No. 5 on Billboard's Most-Played Juke Box Folk Records chart in December 1946.
"Frosty the Snowman"	Gene Autry and The Cass County Boys	1950	With orchestra under the direction of Carl Cotner. Peaked at No. 2 for five consecutive weeks on Billboard's Best Selling Children's Records chart in December 1950 and January 1951, and made these other Billboard music charts in 1950 (with peak positions shown): Best Selling Pop Singles (No. 7) and Best Selling Retail Folk (Country & Western) Records (No. 4). Also made these other Billboard music charts (with peak positions shown): Holiday 100 (No. 90) and Holiday Airplay (No. 49).
"Frosty the Snowman"	Nat King Cole	1950	Debuted and peaked at No. 9 on Billboard's Records Most Played by Disk Jockeys chart in early January 1951. Chipmunk voices provided by The Singing Pussy Cats with orchestra conducted by Pete Rugolo.
"Frosty the Snowman"	Guy Lombardo and His Royal Canadians	1950	Debuted and peaked at No. 28 on Billboard's Records Most Played by Disk Jockeys chart in early January 1951. Vocal chorus by Kenny Gardner and the Lombardo Trio.
"Frosty the Snowman"	Red Foley and the Little Foleys	1951	Peaked at No. 6 on Billboard's Best Selling Children's Records chart in December 1951. The "Little Foleys" are Red's daughters Shirley, Julie and Jenny Foley.
"Frosty the Snowman"	Jimmy Durante	1969	Peaked at No. 27 on Billboard's Holiday 100 chart in early January 2019. Also made these other Billboard music charts in 1950 (with peak positions shown): Holiday Airplay (No. 25), Holiday Digital Song Sales (No. 33), Holiday Streaming Songs (No. 28), and Greatest of All Time Holiday 100 Songs (No. 46). From the 1969 animated television special Frosty the Snowman. Durante originally recorded and released the song in 1951 (on MGM S-K17), with orchestra conducted by Roy Bargy.
"Frosty the Snowman"	Johnny Mathis	2002	Debuted and peaked at No. 29 on Billboard's Adult Contemporary chart in late December 2002 and early January 2003. Also peaked at No. 20 on Billboard's Holiday Airplay chart in early December 2002.
"Frosty the Snowman"	Kimberley Locke	2007	Peaked at No. 1 for one week on Billboard's Adult Contemporary chart in December 2007.
"Frosty the Snowman"	Whitney Wolanin	2012	Peaked at No. 13 on Billboard's Adult Contemporary chart in December 2012.

== G ==
Title	Artist	Year	Additional information
"Gabriel's Message"	Sting	1985	Originally the B-side of the 45 rpm of "Russians" in 1985, it was later included on the 1987 holiday compilation album A Very Special Christmas.
"Gee Whiz, It's Christmas"	Carla Thomas	1963	Peaked at No. 23 on Billboard's Christmas Singles chart in December 1963. Inspired by Thomas's 1961 top 10 hit song "Gee Whiz (Look at His Eyes)".
"Ghost of My Christmas Past"	Robin Meade	2017	Peaked at No. 22 on the Billboard Adult Contemporary chart in early 2018.
"The Gift"	Jim Brickman	1997	Peaked at No. 3 on the Billboard Hot Adult Contemporary Tracks chart during the Christmas season of 1997. Features Collin Raye and Susan Ashton on lead vocals.
"The Gift of Giving"	Bill Withers	1972	Peaked on #5 in Billboard's Christmas survey. The B-side of the pop song "Let Us Love".
"Give Love on Christmas Day"	The Jackson 5	1970	Also a R&B hit for Johnny Gill in 1998.
"Go Tell It on the Mountain"	Peter, Paul & Mary	1964	Reached No. 7 on the Adult Contemporary chart. A version of this classic spiritual by Garth Brooks was first released in 1992, but didn't make the Billboard Hot Country Songs chart until late 1998/early 1999. A medley of this song with "Mary Had a Baby" was a hit for Vanessa L. Williams in 1993, and inspired her to record a full-length holiday album the following year. Also charted by Little Big Town (2006).
"God Rest Ye Merry, Gentlemen"	Garth Brooks	2000	From the album Garth Brooks and the Magic of Christmas. Originally recorded by Garth in 1992. Traditional Christmas carol recorded by hundreds of artists, including MercyMe (2006).
"Goin' Home (Sing a Song of Christmas Cheer)"	Bobby Sherman	1970	B-side is "Love's What You're Getting For Christmas". From his 1970 Christmas album. Contains a portion of "Silent Night". Made the Cashbox Top 100 in 1970.
"Grandma Got Run Over by a Reindeer"	Elmo & Patsy	1979	Written by Randy Brooks. Originally recorded in 1979, new versions were released in 1982 and 1984. The song hit No. 1 on the Billboard Christmas singles charts during the Christmas seasons of 1983–1985, and bubbled under the Hot 100 in 1992. The best-selling novelty Christmas single of all time in the U.S., it spawned toys and an animated TV special that remain popular each year.
"A Great Big Sled"	The Killers	2006	Reached No. 54 on the Billboard Hot 100 chart.
"The Greatest Gift of All"	Kenny Rogers and Dolly Parton	1984	Reached the Billboard Hot 100, Country, and Adult Contemporary charts in early 1985. From the album Once Upon a Christmas.
"Greatest Time of Year"	Aly & AJ	2006	From the album Acoustic Hearts of Winter. Also used in the film The Santa Clause 3.
"Green Chri$tma$"	Stan Freberg	1958	Featuring Daws Butler, Marvin Miller and Wil Wright in a "commercial" parody of Scrooge. Reached No. 3 on the KFWB charts during the 1958 season, despite largely being blacklisted by a radio industry driven by the advertising sales that the record lampooned.
"Grown-Up Christmas List"	David Foster featuring Natalie Cole	1990	Written by David Foster (music) and Linda Thompson Jenner (lyrics). Other hit versions include Amy Grant (1992), Barbra Streisand (2001), Michael Bublé (2003), Kelly Clarkson (2003), and Clay Aiken (2006).

== H ==
Title	Artist	Year	Additional information
"A Hallelujah Christmas"	Cloverton	2012	An altered version of Jewish songwriter Leonard Cohen's song "Hallelujah." Though Cohen's record label had initially approved of the Christianized version of the song, later recordings would revert to Cohen's original, Old Testament-themed lyrics, including a Pentatonix recording of Cohen's original on their 2016 Christmas album that became a Christmas playlist staple.
"Hangin' Round the Mistletoe"	Brooks & Dunn	2002	Hit the Billboard Hot Country Singles chart. From the album It Won't Be Christmas Without You.
"Happy Birthday, Jesus"	Patti Page	1967	Peaked at #15 on Billboard's Christmas Chart 12/16/1967. Backing music is "Silent Night"; issued with 2 different picture sleeves.
"Happy Christmas, Little Friend"	Rosemary Clooney	1953	Written by Rodgers and Hammerstein. Official song of the 1953 Christmas Seals campaign. Also recorded by Dinah Shore (1957).
"The Happy Elf"	Harry Connick, Jr.	2005	From the album Harry for the Holidays.
"Happy Holiday"	Bing Crosby	1942	Written by Irving Berlin for the 1942 film Holiday Inn, co-starring Crosby and Fred Astaire. Hit versions were recorded by Peggy Lee and Steve Lawrence & Eydie Gorme. The Lawrence-Gorme version, released as a single, made the Cash Box Christmas singles chart in 1964.
"Happy Holiday/The Holiday Season"	Andy Williams	1963	Medley arrangement of the songs "Happy Holiday" and "The Holiday Season" (the latter written by Kay Thompson in 1945). First entered Billboard's Holiday 100 chart on the week ending December 10, 2011, peaking at No. 12 on the week ending December 14, 2019. First entered Billboard's main Hot 100 chart at No. 47 on the week ending December 14, 2019, peaking at No. 18 on the week ending January 2, 2021 (following its first chart re-entry). Also made these other Billboard music charts (with peak positions shown): Global 200 (No. 56), Greatest of All Time Holiday 100 Songs (No. 23), Holiday Airplay (No. 9), Holiday Digital Song Sales (No. 11), Holiday Streaming Songs (No. 9), Hot 100 Recurrents (No. 3), LyricFind U.S. (No. 15), and Streaming Songs (No. 14).
"Happy New Year" (1)	Judy Garland	1957	From the album Alone. Written by Gordon Jenkins. Also recorded by Nat King Cole (1962).
"Happy New Year" (2)	ABBA	1980	Released as a CD single in 1999.
"The Happy Reindeer"	Russ Regan	1959	Peaked at No. 34 on the Billboard Hot 100 singles chart. Novelty song inspired by "The Chipmunk Song (Christmas Don't Be Late)". Performed under the pseudonym "Dancer, Prancer and Nervous, the Singing Reindeer".
"Happy Xmas (War Is Over)"	John and Yoko and The Plastic Ono Band with the Harlem Community Choir	1971	Written by John Lennon and Yoko Ono. Debuted and peaked at No. 3 on Billboard's Christmas Singles chart on the week ending December 25, 1971 (re-entering this same chart in 1972, 1983, 1984, and 1985). First entered Billboard's main Hot 100 chart at No. 45 on the week ending December 29, 2018, peaking at No. 38 on the week ending December 31, 2022 (upon its first chart re-entry). Also made these other Billboard music charts (with peak positions shown): Adult Contemporary (No. 32), Adult Pop Airplay (No. 34), Digital Song Sales (No. 34), Global 200 (No. 18), Global 200 Excl. US (No. 18), Greatest of All Time Holiday 100 Songs (No. 16), Holiday 100 (No. 9), Holiday Airplay (No. 2), Holiday Digital Song Sales (No. 1), Holiday Streaming Songs (No. 18), Hot 100 Recurrents (No. 1), LyricFind Global (No. 4), LyricFind U.S. (No. 5), Rock Digital Song Sales (No. 4), Rock Streaming Songs (No. 3), and Streaming Songs (No. 34).
"Happy Xmas (War Is Over)"	Celine Dion	1998	Peaked at No. 32 on Billboard's Holiday 100 chart and at No. 5 on Billboard's Holiday Streaming Songs chart on the week ending January 11, 2014.
"Happy Xmas (War Is Over)"	Sarah McLachlan	2006	Peaked at No. 3 on Billboard's Adult Contemporary chart on the week ending January 6, 2007, and at No. 7 on Billboard's Bubbling Under Hot 100 chart on the week ending December 23, 2006.
"Happy Xmas (War Is Over)"	Josh Groban	2017	Peaked at No. 4 on Billboard's Adult Contemporary chart on the week ending January 3, 2018, and at No. 36 on Billboard's Holiday Digital Song Sales chart on the week ending November 4, 2017.
"Happy Xmas (War Is Over)"	John Legend	2019	Debuted and peaked at No. 69 on Billboard's Hot 100 chart on the week ending January 4, 2020. Also made these other Billboard music charts (with peak positions shown): Adult Contemporary (No. 15), Bubbling Under Hot 100 (No. 3), Holiday 100 (No. 45), Holiday Streaming Songs (No. 30), Hot R&B Songs (No. 7), and R&B Streaming Songs (No. 8).
"Hard Candy Christmas"	Dolly Parton	1982	Peaked at No. 8 on the Billboard country charts. From the movie The Best Little Whorehouse in Texas. Written by Carol Hall in 1978 and originally recorded by the female cast of the Broadway play of the same title.
"Hark! The Herald Angels Sing"	Carrie Underwood	2008	Reached No. 14 on the Billboard Hot Adult Contemporary Tracks chart during the Christmas season of 2008. An 18th-century Methodist hymn. Also recorded by the St. Paul's Episcopal Church children's choir for the soundtrack to A Charlie Brown Christmas, among many other recordings.
"Have Yourself a Merry Little Christmas"	Judy Garland	1944	Peaked at No. 27 on the pop singles chart. Featuring orchestration by Georgie Stoll. Written by Ralph Blane and Hugh Martin, and introduced in the 1944 film Meet Me in St. Louis starring Garland. Other charted versions were recorded by Vince Gill (1993), Kenny G (1994), Martina McBride (1999), Lonestar (2000), Neal McCoy (2001), Ruben Studdard & Tamyra Gray (2003), Aimee Mann (2006), Barry Manilow (2007), Colbie Caillat (2009), and Train (2015).
"Have Yourself a Merry Little Christmas"	Frank Sinatra	1948	His first recorded version was featured on Columbia album, Christmas Songs by Sinatra. He rerecorded the song for his 1957 Capitol album, A Jolly Christmas from Frank Sinatra. Sinatra peaked at #14 on the Billboard's Holiday 100 with the title in 2015.
"Have Yourself a Merry Little Christmas"	The Carpenters	1978	From their Christmas Portrait LP, the song peaked at #27 on Billboard's Holiday Songs chart in 2010.
"Have Yourself a Merry Little Christmas"	Amy Grant	1992	Featured on her album Home For Christmas, the song peaked at #6 on Billboard's Holiday Songs chart in 2002.
"Have Yourself a Merry Little Christmas"	Christina Aguilera	2000	Featured on her album My Kind of Christmas, the song peaked at #31 on Billboard's Holiday 100 in 2015.
"Have Yourself a Merry Little Christmas"	Toni Braxton	2001	Peaked at #14 in 2001 on Billboard's Holiday Songs chart.
"Have Yourself a Merry Little Christmas"	James Taylor	2001	Peaked at #3 on Billboard's Holiday Songs chart in 2002.
"Have Yourself a Merry Little Christmas"	Michael Bublé	2011	From Bublé's 2011 album Christmas. Debuted at No. 49 on Billboard's main Hot 100 chart on the week ending January 2, 2021, eventually peaking at No. 41 on the week ending January 6, 2024 (upon its third chart re-entry). Also made these other Billboard music charts (with peak positions shown): Bubbling Under Hot 100 (No. 3), Global 200 (No. 52), Global 200 Excl. US (No. 183), Greatest of All Time Holiday 100 Songs (No. 48), Holiday 100 (No. 24), Holiday Digital Song Sales (No. 4), Holiday Streaming Songs (No. 8), and Streaming Songs (No. 27).
"Have Yourself a Merry Little Christmas"	Sam Smith	2014	Smith was the first to chart on the Billboard Hot 100 in that chart's entire history. The song also peaked at #9 on Holiday 100
"The Heart of Christmas"	Matthew West	2011	Peaked at No. 6 on Billboard's Adult Contemporary chart for the weeks of December 17, 2011 and December 24, 2011.
"Hello, Mr. Kringle"	Kay Kyser and his Orchestra	1939	Novelty record with Ginny Simms, Ish Kabibble, Sully Mason & Harry Babbitt on vocals.
"Here Comes Santa Claus (Right Down Santa Claus Lane)"	Gene Autry	1947	First released in 1947 on Columbia 37942 as by Gene Autry with Vocal Group. Peaked at No. 4 on Billboard's Best-Selling Retail Folk Records chart (on the week ending December 25, 1948), at No. 7 on Billboard's Most-Played Juke Box Folk Records chart (on the week ending December 25, 1948), at No. 8 on Billboard's Best-Selling Popular Retail Records chart (on the week ending January 1, 1949), at No. 9 on Billboard's Records Most Played By Disk Jockeys chart (on the week ending January 1, 1949), at No. 10 on Billboard's Best-Selling Children's Records chart (on the week ending December 24, 1949), and at No. 8 on Billboard's Country & Western Records Most Played By Folk Disk Jockeys chart (on the week ending January 7, 1950). First entered Billboard's main Hot 100 chart at No. 40 (on the week ending December 22, 2018), peaking at No. 21 (on the week ending January 6, 2024, following its fifth chart re-entry). Also made these other Billboard music charts (with peak positions shown): Country Streaming Songs (No. 4), Global 200 (No. 45), Global 200 Excl. US (No. 145), Greatest of All Time Holiday 100 Songs (No. 28), Holiday 100 (No. 10), Holiday Airplay (No. 8), Holiday Streaming Songs (No. 8), Hot 100 Recurrents (No. 2), Radio Songs (No. 46), and Streaming Songs (No. 14).
"Here It Is Christmas/Baby, It's Cold Outside"	Kenny Rogers featuring Jennifer Nettles	2015	Peaked at No. 18 on the Billboard Adult Contemporary chart.
"Here's Your Sign Christmas"	Bill Engvall	1998	A Christmas version of his 1997 debut hit "Here's Your Sign" with Travis Tritt. A No. 1 hit on the Billboard Country Singles chart in 2003.
"Hey America"	James Brown	1970	Bubbled under the Hot 100 in 1970.
"Hey Santa!"	Carnie and Wendy Wilson	1993	Bubbled under the Hot 100 in 1994. From the album Hey Santa!.
"Hitch a Ride with Santa"	Jim Brickman with Charlie Alan	2015	Peaked at No. 22 on the Billboard Adult Contemporary chart.
"Holiday Hootenanny"	Paul & Paula	1963	Peaked at #19 on Billboard's Christmas Singles Chart on 12/28/1963. An adaptation of "Jingle Bells".
"Holiday in Cambodia"	Richard Cheese	2006	Straight lounge-music cover of the Dead Kennedys song with jingling bells in the background and a "Merry Christmas" shoutout at the end.
"A Holly Jolly Christmas"	Burl Ives	1964	Written by Johnny Marks in 1962. Peaked at No. 13 on Billboard's Christmas Singles survey on the week ending December 26, 1964 (re-entering this same survey at No. 29 on the week ending December 28, 1968). First entered Billboard's Holiday 100 chart on the week ending December 10, 2011, peaking at No. 3 on the week ending December 14, 2019. First entered Billboard's main Hot 100 chart on the week ending January 7, 2017, making the top 10 of this chart for the first time on the week ending January 5, 2019, and attaining an overall peak position of No. 4 one year later on the week ending January 4, 2020 (58 years and two weeks after Ives' previous top 5 single). Also made these other Billboard music charts (with peak positions shown): Adult Contemporary (No. 30), Country Digital Song Sales (No. 2), Country Streaming Songs (No. 1), Digital Song Sales (No. 10), Global 200 (No. 10), Global 200 Excl. US (No. 42), Greatest of All Time Holiday 100 Songs (No. 5), Holiday Airplay (No. 1), Holiday Digital Song Sales (No. 4), Holiday Streaming Songs (No. 3), Hot 100 Recurrents (No. 3), LyricFind Global (No. 2), LyricFind U.S. (No. 1), Radio Songs (No. 20), Ringtones (No. 29), and Streaming Songs (No. 3). First released by The Quinto Sisters in 1964, but made famous by Ives in the 1964 animated holiday television special, Rudolph, the Red-Nosed Reindeer, albeit with a different recording than the one that gained popularity as a single.
"A Holly Jolly Christmas"	Alan Jackson	1992	From the 1992 film Home Alone 2: Lost in New York. Peaked at No. 51 on the Billboard Hot Country Singles & Tracks chart on the week ending January 10, 1998.
"A Holly Jolly Christmas"	Michael Bublé	2011	Peaked at No. 3 on Billboard's Adult Contemporary chart (on the week ending December 17, 2011). Both debuted and peaked at No. 37 on Billboard's main Hot 100 chart (on the week ending January 4, 2025). Also made these other Billboard music charts (with peak positions shown): Global 200 (No. 17), Global 200 Excl. US (No. 14), Greatest of All Time Holiday 100 Songs (No. 44), Holiday 100 (No. 22), Holiday Airplay (No. 14), Holiday Digital Song Sales (No. 10), Holiday Streaming Songs (No. 13), LyricFind U.S. (No. 14), Radio Songs (No. 49), Ringtones (No. 31), and Streaming Songs (No. 37).
"A Holly Jolly Christmas"	Lady Antebellum	2012	Peaked at No. 2 on the Billboard Adult Contemporary chart on the week ending December 22, 2012, and at No. 43 on the Billboard Holiday 100 chart on the week ending December 9, 2017.
"The Holly and the Ivy"	Petula Clark	1958	One of the first British stereo releases, on the EP, A Christmas Carol.
"Home for Christmas"	Daryl Hall & John Oates	2006	From the album Home for Christmas. Not to be confused with "I'll Be Home for Christmas".
"Honky Tonk Christmas"	Alan Jackson	1993	Reached No. 53 on the Billboard Hot Country Singles chart in 1993. From the album Honky Tonk Christmas. Recharted in 1995.
"Hooray for Santa Claus"	Al Hirt	1964	Peaked at #9 on Billboard's Christmas Chart 12/19/1964. Written by Milton DeLugg and Roy Alfred. From the 1964 science fiction film Santa Claus Conquers the Martians.
"How Lovely Is Christmas"	Bing Crosby	1957	With the Arthur Norman choir and orchestra. Written by Arnold Sundgaard and Alec Wilder.
"Hurry Home for Christmas"	Robert Goulet	1968	Written and originally recorded by Steve Lawrence and Eydie Gormé. Goulet's version reached No. 19 in Billboard's Christmas survey, 1968.

== I ==
Title	Artist	Year	Additional information
"I Believe in Father Christmas"	Greg Lake	1975	Written by Greg Lake and Peter Sinfield. Peaked at No. 2 on the Official Singles Chart.
"I Can't Wait for Christmas"	Mindi Abair	2004	Ranked No. 24 on a top-40 list played on Buffalo, New York's Star 102.5.
"I Don't Intend to Spend Christmas Without You"	Margo Guryan	2001	Written and recorded by Guryan as a demo in 1967, and also released as a single by Claudine Longet that year. Covered by Saint Etienne for a 1998 fan club single.
"I Don't Wanna Spend One More Christmas Without You"	'N Sync	2001	Reached No. 24 on the Billboard Hot Adult Contemporary Tracks chart.
"I Farted on Santa's Lap (Now Christmas Is Gonna Stink for Me)"	The Little Stinkers	1998	Novelty song first released in 1998. Charted briefly on Billboard magazine's Hot 100 Singles Sales chart in 2002.
"I Heard the Bells on Christmas Day"	Bing Crosby	1956	Other singers with popular versions: Nat King Cole, The Carpenters, Harry Belafonte, Burl Ives, Johnny Mathis, Sarah McLachlan, and Casting Crowns.
"I Only Want You for Christmas"	Alan Jackson	1991	Reached No. 41 on the Billboard Hot Country Singles chart in 1991. Recharted in 1995 and 1998.
"I Saw Mommy Kissing Santa Claus"	Jimmy Boyd	1952	Reached No. 1 on both the Billboard Pop chart and Best Selling Children's chart in 1952. Written by Tommie Connor.
"I Saw Mommy Kissing Santa Claus"	Spike Jones and his City Slickers	1952	Peaked at #4 on Billboard's Pop chart. Also charted by Molly Bee in 1952 peaking at #19 on Billboard's Pop Singles survey. Other popular recordings were made by The Ronettes (1963), John Mellencamp (1987), Reba McEntire (1999), and Jessica Simpson.
"I Saw Mommy Kissing Santa Claus"	The Four Seasons	1964	Peaked at #19 on Billboard's Christmas Records Charts.
"I Saw Mommy Kissing Santa Claus"	The Jackson 5	1970	From their Jackson 5 Christmas Album. Debuted on Billboard's Holiday 100 chart in December 2011, peaking at No. 30 in December 2023. Debuted and peaked at No. 43 on Billboard's main Hot 100 chart on the week ending January 6, 2024.
"I Saw Three Ships"	Sting	1997	This 'new age' version of the traditional carol was a charity single and video.
"I Want a Hippopotamus for Christmas"	Gayla Peevey	1953	Written by John Rox. Features orchestration by Norman Leyden. Also recorded by The Three Stooges in 1960.
"I Want Eddie Fisher for Christmas"	Betty Johnson	1954	Released during the height of the Eddie Fisher craze. Peaked at No. 22 on the Music Vendor chart. Also recorded by Spike Jones during the same Christmas season.
"I Wish Everyday Could Be Like Christmas"	Jon Bon Jovi	1992	B-side to the Bon Jovi song "Keep the Faith". Also replaced "Back Door Santa" on later pressings of the 1987 various artists holiday compilation A Very Special Christmas.
"I Wish It Could Be Christmas Everyday"	Wilson Phillips	2010	Peaked at No. 13 on Billboard's Adult Contemporary chart in early 2011. Remake of the 1973 UK hit by Wizzard. Re-recorded by the writer, Wizzard frontman Roy Wood, with his Roy Wood Big Band as a live single in 1995. Also covered by the A*Teens (2002), The Big Reunion, and Girls Aloud.
"I Won't Be Home for Christmas"	Blink-182	2001	Reached No. 34 on Billboard's Hot 100 Sales chart.
"I Yust Go Nuts at Christmas"	Yogi Yorgesson with the Johnny Duffy Trio	1949	Written by Yorgesson under his real name, Harry Stewart. Peaked at #5 on Billboard's "Best Seller" and "Most Played By Jockeys" chart. Covered live by farm broadcaster Orion Samuelson and the Uff da Band.
"I'll Be Home"	Meghan Trainor	2014	Written, produced and recorded by Trainor, and a track included the 2014 Epic Records label holiday EP, I'll Be Home for Christmas. Peaked at No. 5 on Billboard's Adult Contemporary chart in late December 2014.
"I'll Be Home for Christmas"	Bing Crosby	1943	Written during World War II by Kim Gannon, Walter Kent and Buck Ram to honor soldiers overseas. Charted covers include versions by Frank Sinatra, The Brothers Four (1966), Lonestar (1997), Reba McEntire (1999), Neal McCoy (2001), Kenny Chesney (2003), Josh Groban and Camila Cabello. On Billboard's Adult Contemporary chart, versions by Brian McKnight (2008), Kelly Clarkson (2012), and Kanisha K (2015) also charted.
"I'll Make Every Day Christmas (For My Woman)"	Joe Tex	1967	Peaked at No. 15 on the Billboard Christmas charts.
"I'm Gonna Be Warm This Winter"	Connie Francis	1962	Charted on the Billboard Hot 100 and Adult Contemporary charts in 1962.
"I'm Gonna Lasso Santa Claus"	Brenda Lee	1956	Written by Frankie Adams & Wilbur Jones. Credited as "Little Brenda Lee (9 Years Old)" though she turned 12 in 1956.
"I've Got My Love to Keep Me Warm"	Les Brown & His Orchestra	1948	Written in 1937 by Irving Berlin and introduced in the 1937 film On the Avenue by its stars, Dick Powell and Alice Faye. Les Brown's instrumental hit version was recorded in 1946, but didn't become a million-selling top 10 song until late 1948 and early 1949. Three other versions by the Mills Brothers, Art Lund, and the Starlighters also hit the pop singles chart in early 1949. The song has also been recorded by such artists as Ray Noble & His Orchestra, Billie Holiday, Ella Fitzgerald, Doris Day, Dean Martin, Frank Sinatra, Bette Midler and Kimberley Locke.
"If Every Day Was Like Christmas"	Elvis Presley with The Jordanaires and The Imperials Quartet	1966	Written by Red West. Charted again in 1967.
"If We Make It Through December"	Merle Haggard	1973	From the album A Christmas Present. Charted again in 1974. Made the Pop, Country, Easy Listening and Christmas surveys in Billboard in late 1973-early 1974.
"It Came Upon a Midnight Clear"	Daryl Hall & John Oates	2006	A No. 1 hit on the Billboard Hot Adult Contemporary Tracks chart. Traditional carol previously recorded by over 100 other artists.
"It Doesn't Have to Be That Way"	Jim Croce	1973	Originally released as the B-side of his 1973 single "One Less Set of Footsteps". Reissued as an A-side in December 1973, reaching No. 64 on the Billboard Hot 100 chart.
"It May Be Winter Outside (But in My Heart It's Spring)"	Felice Taylor	1967	Written by Barry White. Also a hit for Love Unlimited in 1973.
"It Must Have Been Love (Christmas for the Broken Hearted)"	Roxette	1987	Originally recorded and released in Sweden during the 1987 holiday season, the song was slightly revised to remove explicit Christmas references for its American release; the later version of song reached number 1 on the Billboard Hot 100 and the charts of several other countries in June 1990.
"It Must Have Been the Mistletoe"	Barbara Mandrell	1984	Also a hit for Barbra Streisand in 2002.
"It Wasn't His Child"	Sawyer Brown	1988	Written by Skip Ewing. Peaked at No. 51 on the Billboard Hot Country Singles chart in 1989. Also a hit for Trisha Yearwood in 1994.
"It Won't Be Christmas Without You"	Brooks & Dunn	2002	Hit the Billboard Hot Country Singles chart. From the album It Won't Be Christmas Without You.
"It Won't Be the Same This Year"	Vince Gill	1995	From the 1993 album Let There Be Peace on Earth. Peaked at No. 74 on the Billboard Hot Country Singles chart.
"It Wouldn't Be Christmas (Without You)"	John Tesh	2002	Peaked at No. 7 on Billboard's Adult Contemporary chart. From the album Christmas Worship.
"It's Beginning to Look a Lot Like Christmas"	Perry Como and The Fontane Sisters with Mitchell Ayres & His Orchestra	1951	Composed by Meredith Willson while he was writing The Music Man. Peaked at No. 19 on Billboard's Records Most Played by Disk Jockeys chart on the week ending January 5, 1952, and at No. 23 on the Billboard Best Selling Pop Singles chart on the week ending December 22, 1951. First entered Billboard's main Hot 100 chart at No. 42 (on the week ending December 29, 2018), peaking at No. 12 (on the week ending December 26, 2020, following its second chart re-entry). Also made these other Billboard music charts (with peak positions shown): Global 200 (No. 22), Global 200 Excl. US (No. 40), Greatest of All Time Holiday 100 Songs (No. 33), Holiday 100 (No. 8), Holiday Airplay (No. 41), Holiday Streaming Songs (No. 5), Hot 100 Recurrents (No. 4), LyricFind Global (No. 14), LyricFind U.S. (No. 14), and Streaming Songs (No. 5).
"It's Beginning to Look a Lot Like Christmas"	Johnny Mathis	1986	From the 1986 album Christmas Eve with Johnny Mathis. Peaked at No. 15 on Billboard's Holiday 100 chart (week ending December 10, 2016), at No. 3 on Billboard's Holiday Airplay chart (week ending January 3, 2009), at No. 22 on Billboard's Holiday Streaming Songs chart (week ending December 10, 2016), and at No. 44 on Billboard's Holiday Digital Songs chart (week ending November 23, 2019).
"It's Beginning to Look a Lot Like Christmas"	Michael Bublé	2011	Peaked at No. 2 on Billboard's Adult Contemporary chart (on the week ending December 24, 2011) after entering Billboard's main Hot 100 chart at No. 96 one week earlier. Peaked at No. 12 on the Hot 100 chart (on the week ending January 4, 2025, following its fifth chart re-entry). Also made these other Billboard music charts (with peak positions shown): Christian Airplay (No. 32), Christian AC Airplay (No. 23), Digital Song Sales (No. 16), Global 200 (No. 6), Global 200 Excl. US (No. 4), Greatest of All Time Holiday 100 Songs (No. 14), Holiday 100 (No. 8), Holiday Airplay (No. 17), Holiday Digital Song Sales (No. 3), Holiday Streaming Songs (No. 2), Hot 100 Recurrents (No. 3), Hot Christian Songs (No. 32), LyricFind Global (No. 1), LyricFind U.S. (No. 1), Radio Songs (No. 47), Streaming Songs (No. 11), and TikTok Top 50 (No. 22).
"It's Christmas"	Ronnie Milsap	1986	From the album Christmas with Ronnie Milsap. Later covered by Trace Adkins.
"It's Christmas (All Over the World)"	Sheena Easton	1985	From the 1985 film Santa Claus: The Movie. Also a single by New Edition from their 1985 album Christmas All Over the World.
"It's Christmas Time All Over the World"	Sammy Davis, Jr.	1963	Also recorded by the Jackie Gleason orchestra.
"(It's Gonna Be a) Lonely Christmas"	The Orioles	1948	Reached No. 8 on Billboard magazine's R&B Juke Box chart in 1948, and No. 5 on the same singles chart the following year.
"It's Just Another New Year's Eve"	Barry Manilow	1977	Peaked at No. 33 on the Billboard Adult Contemporary chart in 1978. From the album Barry Manilow Live.
"It's So Close to Christmas (And I'm So Far From Home)"	The Bellamy Brothers	1981	Reached No. 62 on the Billboard Hot Country Singles chart in 1981.
"It's the Most Wonderful Time of the Year"	Andy Williams	1963	Written in 1963 by George Wyle and Edward Pola, and selected as the theme song for Christmas Seals in both 1968 and 1976. First entered Billboard's Holiday 100 chart on the week ending December 10, 2011, peaking at No. 2 on the week ending December 8, 2018. First entered Billboard's main Hot 100 chart at No. 48 on the week ending January 7, 2017, reaching the top 10 for the first time on the week ending December 29, 2018, and peaking at No. 5 two years later on the week ending January 2, 2021 (following its fourth chart re-entry; Williams' highest rank on the Hot 100 chart since 1963). Also made these other Billboard music charts (with peak positions shown): Digital Song Sales (No. 50), Global 200 (No. 7), Global 200 Excl. US (No. 10), Greatest of All Time Holiday 100 Songs (No. 7), Holiday Airplay (No. 2), Holiday Digital Song Sales (No. 1), Holiday Streaming Songs (No. 2), LyricFind Global (No. 13), LyricFind U.S. (No. 12), Radio Songs (No. 25), Ringtones (No. 22), Streaming Songs (No. 3), and TikTok Top 50 (No. 27).
"It's the Most Wonderful Time of the Year"	Johnny Mathis	1986	Peaked at No. 76 on the Billboard Holiday 100 chart on the week ending December 13, 2014, and at No. 7 on the Billboard Holiday Airplay chart on the week ending December 10, 2005.
"It's the Most Wonderful Time of the Year"	Garth Brooks	1999	Peaked at No. 56 on the Billboard Hot Country Singles & Tracks chart on the week ending January 8, 2000.
"It's the Most Wonderful Time of the Year"	BarlowGirl	2008	Peaked at No. 21 on the Billboard Hot Christian Songs chart and at No. 25 on the Billboard Christian AC Songs chart (both on the week ending January 3, 2009).
"It's the Most Wonderful Time of the Year"	Harry Connick, Jr.	2008	Peaked at No. 9 on the Billboard Adult Contemporary chart on the week ending December 20, 2008.

== J ==
Title	Artist	Year	Additional information
"Jesu, Joy of Man's Desiring"	Apollo 100	1971	Composed by Johann Sebastian Bach. The Apollo 100 version, titled simply "Joy," reached No. 6 on the Billboard Hot 100 in 1972.
"Jesu, Joy of Man's Desiring"	George Winston	1982	From the album December. Like the Apollo 100 rendering, Winston's rendition, with an arrangement by David Qualey, also used the shortened title "Joy."
"Jesu, Joy of Man's Desiring"	Josh Groban	2005	
"Jingle Bell Rock"	Bobby Helms	1957	Written by Joe Beale and Jim Boothe, and featuring backing vocals by the Anita Kerr Singers. Peaked at No. 6 on Billboard's Top 100 Sides chart and at No. 7 on Billboard's Best Sellers In Stores chart on the week ending January 4, 1958. First entered Billboard's main Hot 100 chart on the week ending December 22, 1958 (originally peaking at No. 35 one week later), then reaching the top 10 for the first time on the week ending January 5, 2019 (following its seventh chart re-entry), and then attaining an overall peak position of No. 3 on the week ending January 4, 2020 (setting the record for the longest wait for the first top 5 hit after an artist's initial appearance on the chart: 61 years, 4 months and 2 weeks). First entered Billboard's Holiday 100 chart on the week ending December 10, 2011, peaking at No. 2 on the week ending December 24, 2016. Also made these other Billboard music charts (with peak positions shown): Adult Contemporary (No. 18), Country Airplay (No. 60), Country Digital Song Sales (No. 3), Country Streaming Songs (No. 1), Digital Song Sales (No. 8), Global 200 (No. 4), Global 200 Excl. US (No. 5), Greatest of All Time Holiday 100 Songs (No. 3), Holiday Airplay (No. 1), Holiday Digital Song Sales (No. 2), Holiday Streaming Songs (No. 2), Hot 100 Recurrents (No. 1), Hot Country Songs (No. 60), Radio Songs (No. 15), LyricFind Global (No. 18), Streaming Songs (No. 2), TikTok Top 50 (No. 18), Top Triller Global (No. 10), and Top Triller U.S. (No. 4).
"Jingle Bell Rock"	Chet Atkins	1961	Peaked at No. 106 on the Billboard Bubbling Under The Hot 100 chart on the week ending January 7, 1962.
"Jingle Bell Rock"	Bobby Rydell & Chubby Checker	1961	Peaked at No. 21 on the Billboard Hot 100 chart on the week ending January 7, 1962. Featured on their album, Bobby Rydell/Chubby Checker.
"Jingle Bell Rock"	Brenda Lee	1964	First entered the Billboard Christmas Singles chart on the week ending December 19, 1964, peaking at No. 8 on this same chart on the week ending December 16, 1967.
"Jingle Bell Rock"	Daryl Hall & John Oates	1983	Peaked at No. 6 on the Billboard Holiday Airplay chart on the week ending December 13, 2008, and at No. 24 on the Billboard Holiday 100 chart on the week ending December 10, 2011.
"Jingle Bell Rock"	George Strait	1999	Peaked at No. 69 on the Billboard Hot Country Singles & Tracks chart on the week ending January 1, 2000.
"Jingle Bell Rock"	Aaron Tippin	2001	Peaked at No. 52 on the Billboard Hot Country Singles & Tracks chart on the week ending January 12, 2002.
"Jingle Bell Rock"	Newsboys	2010	Peaked at No. 15 on the Billboard Hot Christian Songs chart and at No. 9 on the Billboard Christian AC Songs chart on the week ending January 8, 2011.
"Jingle Bells"	Benny Goodman and his Orchestra	1935	Peaked at #18 on Billboard's popular singles chart. The B-Side was "Santa Claus Is Comin' To Town" by the Tommy Dorsey Orchestra. In 1946, hit versions were recorded by Frank Sinatra with The Ken Lane Singers and Perry Como. Other hit versions were recorded by Peggy Lee (1960), Jo Stafford (1964), Smokey Robinson & The Miracles (1970), Barry Manilow duet with Exposé (1991), BeBe & CeCe Winans (1993), SheDaisy (2000), Kenny Chesney (2003). and the Glee Cast (2010).
"Jingle Bells"	Glenn Miller and his Orchestra	1941	Features vocals by Tex Beneke, Ernie Caceres and The Modernaires. It peaked at #5 on Billboard's popular singles chart.
"Jingle Bells"	Bing Crosby and The Andrews Sisters	1943	Peaked at #19 on Billboard's popular singles chart. The flip side is their version of "Santa Claus Is Comin' to Town" which also charted.
"Jingle Bells"	Les Paul	1951	Peaked at #10 on Billboard's popular singles chart.
"Jingle Bells"	The Singing Dogs	1955	The 1955 novelty version by Don Charles & The Singing Dogs made the Billboard special Christmas singles chart in 1971–1973, 1983 and 1984 peaking at #1 in 1972. Initially released as the b-side to "Oh! Susanna" which peaked at #22 on Billboard's Top 100 in 1955.
"Jingle Bells"	Frank Sinatra (with the Orchestra & Chorus of Gordon Jenkins)	1957	From the 1957 studio album A Jolly Christmas from Frank Sinatra. First entered Billboard's main Hot 100 chart at No. 49 (on the week ending January 5, 2019), and peaked at No. 16 (on the week ending December 30, 2023, following its third chart re-entry). Also made these other Billboard music charts (with peak positions shown): Digital Song Sales (No. 68), Global 200 (No. 23), Global 200 Excl. US (No. 51), Greatest of All Time Holiday 100 Songs (No. 39), Holiday 100 (No. 14), Holiday Airplay (No. 10), Holiday Digital Song Sales (No. 10), Holiday Streaming Songs (No. 12), LyricFind Global (No. 1), LyricFind U.S. (No. 1), Radio Songs (No. 44), and Streaming Songs (No. 15).
"Jingle Bells"	Ramsey Lewis Trio	1964	Peaked at #21 on Billboard's Christmas Holiday Charts. From their popular album Sound of Christmas
"Jingle Bells"	Booker T. & the MG's	1966	Peaked at #20 on Billboard's Christmas Holiday Charts. From their popular album In the Christmas Spirit.
"Jingle Bells"	Yello	1995	The only holiday song to chart Billboard's dance charts peaked at #44. The song is featured on the soundtrack to The Santa Clause.
"Jingle Bells"	Kimberley Locke	2006	Spent one week at No. 1 on Billboard's Hot Adult Contemporary Tracks chart in 2006. From her popular Christmas album.
"Jingle Bells"	Michael Bublé featuring The Puppini Sisters	2011	From his popular Christmas album, this version was recorded in the style of Bing Crosby and The Andrews Sisters and peaked at #37 on the Billboard Holiday 100.
"Jingo Jango"	Bert Kaempfert and his Orchestra	1963	Instrumental composed by Bert Kaempfert and Herbert Rehbein. Peaked at #8 on Billboard's Christmas Single chart 12/7/1963. Charted again in 1965.
"Joy to the World"	Mannheim Steamroller	1995	From the album Christmas in the Aire. First recorded by The Trinity Choir in 1911. Also released by the Percy Faith orchestra (featured prominently on the Yule Log), Mariah Carey (1995, whose version incorporates a portion of Hoyt Axton's non-Christmas song of the same name), and Faith Hill (2008). A 2015 version by Pentatonix peaked at No. 9 on the Billboard Adult Contemporary chart in 2015.
"A Joyful Noise"	Jo Dee Messina	2002	From the album A Joyful Noise. Peaked at No. 16 on the Adult Contemporary chart.
"Just Put a Ribbon in Your Hair"	Alan Jackson	2004	From the various artists album A Very Special Acoustic Christmas.

== K ==
Title	Artist	Year	Additional information
"The Kid"	Clint Black	1995	Peaked at No. 71 on the Billboard Hot Country Singles & Tracks chart in 1996, at No. 67 on the same chart in 1999, and at No. 71 on the same chart in 2000. Taken from Black's 1995 holiday album, Looking for Christmas.
"The Kid in Me"	Craig Morgan	2000	Peaked at No. 68 on the Billboard Hot Country Singles & Tracks chart.
"A Kiss for Christmas (O Tannenbaum)"	Joe Dowell	1961	New lyrics set to the melody of an old German folk song. Peaked at No. 110 on the Billboard Bubbling Under Hot 100 Singles chart.
"Kissin' by the Mistletoe"	Aretha Franklin	1961	Appeared in the "Music Vendor" Christmas chart of 1963.

== L ==
Title	Artist	Year	Additional information
"Last Christmas"	Wham!	1984	Written by George Michael and first released in the United Kingdom on December 3, 1984. First released in the United States as the final track on Wham!'s 1986 studio album, Music from the Edge of Heaven. Made its first appearance on a U.S. music chart on Billboard's Hot 100 Airplay chart on the week ending January 3, 1998, peaking at No. 58 one week later (the same week it also entered and peaked at No. 22 on Billboard's Adult Contemporary chart). First entered Billboard's main Hot 100 chart at No. 50 on the week ending January 7, 2017, eventually peaking at No. 3 on the week ending December 14, 2024 (following its eighth chart re-entry). Also made these other Billboard music charts (with peak positions shown): Adult Pop Airplay (No. 40), Digital Song Sales (No. 2), Global 200 (No. 2), Global 200 Excl. US (No. 2), Greatest of All Time Holiday 100 Songs (No. 8), Holiday 100 (No. 3), Holiday Airplay (No. 3), Holiday Digital Song Sales (No. 2), Holiday Streaming Songs (No. 3), LyricFind Global (No. 1), LyricFind U.S. (No. 1), Radio Songs (No. 22), Streaming Songs (No. 3), and TikTok Top 50 (No. 1). Rumored to have been written for Easter, but later changed to Christmas to boost sales.
"Last Christmas"	Ashley Tisdale	2006	Peaked at No. 47 on the Billboard Holiday Digital Song Sales chart on the week ending November 26, 2011.
"Last Christmas"	Taylor Swift	2007	Peaked at No. 28 on the Billboard Hot Country Songs chart on the week ending January 5, 2008, at No. 18 on the Billboard Holiday 100 chart on the week ending January 7, 2012, at No. 7 on the Billboard Holiday Digital Song Sales chart on the week ending January 12, 2013, and at No. 12 on the Billboard Holiday Airplay chart on the week ending January 10, 2015.
"Last Christmas"	Glee Cast featuring Lea Michele and Cory Monteith	2009	Performed in the 2010 Glee episode "A Very Glee Christmas". First version of song to make the Billboard Hot 100 chart, peaking at No. 63 on the week ending December 19, 2009. Also peaked at No. 3 on the Billboard Holiday Digital Songs chart on the week ending January 8, 2011, and at No. 27 on the Billboard Adult Contemporary chart on the week ending December 26, 2009.
"Last Christmas"	Ariana Grande	2013	Peaked at No. 1 on the Billboard Holiday Digital Song Sales chart on the week ending December 7, 2013, at No. 32 on the Billboard Holiday 100 chart on the week ending December 14, 2013, at No. 22 on the Billboard Holiday Streaming Songs chart on the week ending December 14, 2013, at No. 26 on the Billboard Adult Contemporary chart on the week ending January 4, 2014, and at No. 96 on the Billboard Hot 100 chart on the week ending December 7, 2013.
"Last Christmas"	Carly Rae Jepsen	2015	Debuted and peaked at No. 43 on Billboard's Holiday Digital Song Sales chart on the week ending December 12, 2015.
"Last Christmas"	Lauren Spencer-Smith	2022	Peaked at No. 49 on Billboard's Holiday 100 chart on the week ending January 7, 2023. Also debuted and peaked at No. 43 Billboard's Holiday Streaming Songs chart on the week ending December 10, 2022.
"Leroy the Redneck Reindeer"	Joe Diffie	1995	Reached No. 33 on the Country charts in 1996. From the album Mr. Christmas.
"Let It Be Christmas"	Alan Jackson	2002	Reached No. 37 on the Billboard Hot Country Singles chart in 2002. From the album Let It Be Christmas.
"Let It Snow"	Boyz II Men	1993	Co-written and co-produced by R&B singer Brian McKnight, who also provides guest vocals on the track. Not the same song as "Let It Snow! Let It Snow! Let It Snow!".
"Let It Snow! Let It Snow! Let It Snow!"	Vaughn Monroe and His Orchestra	1945	Featuring backing vocals by the Norton Sisters. Spent six weeks at No. 1 on the Billboard Records Most-Played On The Air chart, five weeks at No. 1 on the Billboard Best-Selling Popular Retail Records chart, and five weeks at No. 1 on the Billboard Most-Played Juke Box Records chart in January and February 1946. Written by Sammy Cahn and Jule Styne.
"Let It Snow! Let It Snow! Let It Snow!"	Connee Boswell and Russ Morgan and His Orchestra	1946	Peaked at No. 9 on the Billboard Most-Played Juke Box Records chart in late January and early February 1946.
"Let It Snow! Let It Snow! Let It Snow!"	Bob Crosby and Orchestra	1946	Peaked at No. 14 on the Billboard Most-Played Juke Box Records chart in February 1946.
"Let It Snow! Let It Snow! Let It Snow!"	Woody Herman and His Orchestra	1946	Peaked at No. 7 on the Billboard Records Most-Played On The Air chart in February 1946.
"Let It Snow! Let It Snow! Let It Snow!"	Frank Sinatra with The B. Swanson Quartet	1950	Made the following Billboard music charts (with peak positions shown): Holiday 100 (No. 45), Holiday Airplay (No. 30), and Holiday Streaming Songs (No. 23).
"Let It Snow! Let It Snow! Let It Snow!"	Dean Martin	1959	From Martin's 1959 album, A Winter Romance (with orchestra conducted by Gus Levene). First entered Billboard's Hot 100 chart on the week ending December 15, 2018, peaking at No. 7 on the week ending January 6, 2024 (following its fifth chart re-entry). Also made these other Billboard music charts (with peak positions shown): Global 200 (No. 6), Global 200 Excl. US (No. 8), Holiday 100 (No. 6), Holiday Airplay (No. 7), Holiday Digital Song Sales (No. 9), Holiday Streaming Songs (No. 5), Radio Songs (No. 35), and Streaming Songs (No. 5).
"Let It Snow! Let It Snow! Let It Snow!"	Ricochet	1996	Peaked at No. 39 on the Billboard Hot Country Singles & Tracks chart on the week ending January 8, 2000.
"Let It Snow! Let It Snow! Let It Snow!"	Martina McBride	1998	Peaked at No. 64 on the Billboard Hot Country Singles & Tracks chart on the week ending January 9, 1999
"Let It Snow! Let It Snow! Let It Snow!"	George Strait	1999	Peaked at No. 72 on the Billboard Hot Country Singles & Tracks chart on the week ending December 18, 1999.
"Let It Snow! Let It Snow! Let It Snow!"	Carly Simon	2005	Peaked at No. 6 on the Billboard Adult Contemporary chart on the week ending December 24, 2005.
"Let It Snow! Let It Snow! Let It Snow!"	Mannheim Steamroller	2007	Peaked at No. 26 on the Billboard Adult Contemporary chart on the week ending December 29, 2007.
"Let It Snow! Let It Snow! Let It Snow!"	Rod Stewart	2012	Spent five weeks at No. 1 on the Billboard Adult Contemporary chart in December 2012 into early January 2013.
"Let It Snow! Let It Snow! Let It Snow!"	India Arie & Joe Sample	2015	Peaked at No. 16 on the Billboard Adult Contemporary chart on the week ending December 26, 2015.
"Let It Snow! Let It Snow! Let It Snow!"	Pentatonix	2017	Peaked at No. 17 on the Billboard Adult Contemporary chart on the week ending January 3, 2018.
"Let It Snow! Let It Snow! Let It Snow!"	Seal	2017	Peaked at No. 11 on the Billboard Adult Contemporary chart on the week ending December 23, 2017.
"Let's Light the Christmas Tree"	Ruby Wright	1957	Hit various pop charts in Billboard and Music Vendor.
"Let's Make a Baby King"	Wynonna Judd	1994	From the album Tell Me Why.
"Let's Make Christmas Mean Something This Year"	James Brown	1967	Peaked at #13 on Billboard's Christmas Chart 12/9/1967. Narrated by Brown, with female backing vocals by The Charmaines From the album James Brown Sings Christmas Songs.
"Let's Make Christmas Merry, Baby"	Amos Milburn and his Aladdin Chicken-Shackers	1949	A hit on Billboard magazine's R&B Best Seller and Juke Box singles chart in 1949.
"Let's Start the New Year Right"	Bing Crosby	1943	With the Bob Crosby orchestra. From the 1942 film Holiday Inn.
"Let the Season Take Wing"	Amy Grant	1992	Single available only as a cassette. Packaged with the Amy Grant album Home For Christmas at Target stores in 1992.
"Light of the Stable"	Emmylou Harris	1975	Featuring backing vocals by Dolly Parton, Linda Ronstadt and Neil Young.
"Like It's Christmas"	Jonas Brothers	2019	Peaked at No. 1 on Billboard's Adult Contemporary chart for three consecutive weeks in December 2019, and at No. 39 on Billboard's main Hot 100 chart (on the week ending January 4, 2025, following its second chart re-entry). Also made these other Billboard music charts (with peak positions shown): Adult Pop Airplay (No. 32), Bubbling Under Hot 100 (No. 4), Digital Song Sales (No. 7), Global 200 (No. 39), Global 200 Excl. US (No. 64), Greatest of All Time Holiday 100 Songs (No. 70), Holiday 100 (No. 18), Holiday Airplay (No. 44), Holiday Digital Song Sales (No. 1), Holiday Streaming Songs (No. 15), LyricFind Global (No. 3), and Streaming Songs (No. 30).
"Li'l Elfy"	Ray Bolger	1963	With the Gene Garf orchestra; charted for one week on the Billboard Christmas charts peaking at #10.
"Linus and Lucy (Peanuts Theme)"	Vince Guaraldi Trio	1964	From the 1964 album Jazz Impressions of A Boy Named Charlie Brown. Also included on the soundtrack album to the 1965 animated holiday television special, A Charlie Brown Christmas. First entered Billboard's Holiday 100 chart at No. 20 (on the week ending December 8, 2012), peaking at No. 17 one week later. Both debuted and peaked at No. 37 on Billboard's main Hot 100 chart (on the week ending January 1, 2022). Also made these other Billboard music charts (with peak positions shown): Global 200 (No. 117), Greatest of All Time Holiday 100 Songs (No. 34), Holiday Airplay (No. 8), Holiday Digital Song Sales (No. 12), Holiday Streaming Songs (No. 30), Hot 100 Recurrents (No. 1), Radio Songs (No. 45), and Streaming Songs (No. 35).
"Little Altar Boy"	Vic Dana	1961	With the Hank Levine orchestra. Charted again in 1965. Not explicitly a Christmas song, its inclusion on Christmas albums by Jack Jones, Andy Williams, Glen Campbell and (posthumously) the Carpenters established it as a Christmas song.
"Little Becky's Christmas Wish"	Becky Lamb	1967	Spoken-word record featuring a little girl who narrates a letter to Santa Claus about her brother Tommy, who is killed in Vietnam. Quite controversial at the time, the record went to No. 2 on the Billboard Christmas chart despite the fact many radio stations refused to play it. Little is known about Becky except for the fact that she was five years old at the time of the recording; the B-side, "Go to Sleep Little Lambs" is credited to Bill Lamb, presumably Becky's father.
"The Little Boy that Santa Claus Forgot"	Vera Lynn	1937	Covered by Nat King Cole in 1953. Sung on-screen by James Belushi in film Jingle All The Way.
"The Little Drummer Boy (Carol of the Drum)"	Harry Simeone Chorale	1958	Written in 1941 by Katherine K. Davis. Harry Simeone's was the first to chart the song peaking at #13 on the Hot 100. The single went on to peak at #1 for 10 weeks on Billboard's Christmas Record chart. It peaked at #10 on the Holiday Song chart in 2005 and at #25 on the Holiday 100 in 2007. Released as part of a medley by The Ray Conniff Singers in 1962. "Jolly Old St. Nicholas/Little Drummer Boy" peaked Billboard's Holiday Song chart at #19 in 2005. Other charted versions include RuPaul (1994), Restless Heart (1999), Josh Groban (2007), Wilson Phillips (2010), Richard Marx (2012), and for KING & COUNTRY (2017). A version by the Vienna Boys Choir also hit big when it was featured in the Rankin/Bass animated TV special of the same name.
"The Little Drummer Boy (Carol of the Drum)"	Johnny Cash	1959	Peaked at #63 on Billboard's Hot 100.
"The Little Drummer Boy (Carol of the Drum)"	Bing Crosby	1963	Peaked at #46 on the Holiday 100 in 2019. Crosby also recorded the medley "Peace On Earth/Little Drummer Boy" with David Bowie in 1977.
"The Little Drummer Boy (Carol of the Drum)"	Johnny Mathis	1963	From his 1963 album Sounds of Christmas. Peaked at #11 on Billboard's Christmas Records chart.
"The Little Drummer Boy (Carol of the Drum)"	Joan Baez	1966	From her album Noël. The single peaked at #16 for 3 weeks on Billboard's Best Bets For Christmas
"The Little Drummer Boy (Carol of the Drum)"	Kenny Burrell	1966	Peaked at #21 on Billboard's Best Bets For Christmas in 1967.
"The Little Drummer Boy (Carol of the Drum)"	Lou Rawls	1967	Peaked at No. 2 for 2 weeks on Billboard magazine's special Christmas Singles chart in 1967 (it charted again in 1969).
"The Little Drummer Boy (Carol of the Drum)"	Bob Segar & The Silver Bullet Band	1987	His version from the multi-artist A Very Special Christmas peaked at No. 42 on Billboard magazine's Holiday Songs in 2005.
"The Little Drummer Boy (Carol of the Drum)"	Pentatonix	2013	Peaked at #1 on the Holiday 100.
"Little Saint Nick"	The Beach Boys	1963	Written by Brian Wilson and Mike Love. Peaked at No. 3 on Billboard's Christmas Singles chart (on the week ending December 28, 1963; re-entering this same chart again in 1964). First entered Billboard's main Hot 100 chart at No. 47 (on the week ending January 2, 2021), peaking at No. 25 (on the week ending January 6, 2024, three weeks after its third chart re-entry). Also made these other Billboard music charts (with peak positions shown): Digital Song Sales (No. 63), Global 200 (No. 34), Global 200 Excl. US (No. 69), Greatest of All Time Holiday 100 Songs (No. 35), Holiday 100 (No. 22), Holiday Airplay (No. 14), Holiday Digital Song Sales (No. 9), Holiday Streaming Songs (No. 20), Hot 100 Recurrents (No. 3), and Streaming Songs (No. 21).
"Little Sandy Sleighfoot"	Jimmy Dean	1957	Novelty song performed with the Ray Ellis Orchestra.
"Lonesome Christmas"	Lowell Fulson	1950	Originally charted on the R&B charts, hit the Christmas singles chart in 1964–1968 and 1970.
"Love For Christmas"	Felix Gross and his Orchestra	1949	Reached No. 9 on the Hot R&B Singles chart. Featured Tiny Webb on guitar and Joe Howard on tenor sax.
"Love Is"	Leza Miller	1967	Charted for 2 weeks on the Christmas Singles chart, peaking at No. 20. B-side is "Loneliest Christmas Tree".
"Love on Layaway"	Gloria Estefan	2000	Included on the 2001 album Now That's What I Call Christmas!.

== M ==
Title	Artist	Year	Additional information
"Macarena Christmas"	Los del Río	1996	Dance record "Macarena", mixed with a melody of holiday songs, including "Joy to the World", "Jingle Bells", "Silent Night", "Rudolph the Red-Nosed Reindeer", "White Christmas", and "Auld Lang Syne".
"The Man with All the Toys"	The Beach Boys	1964	Reached No. 6 on the Billboard Christmas chart in 1964.
"Marshmallow World"	Bing Crosby	1950	Lyrics written by Carl Sigman and music composed by Peter De Rose. Also recorded by Darlene Love for the classic 1963 holiday album A Christmas Gift for You from Phil Spector. Other popular versions recorded by Brenda Lee in 1964 and Dean Martin in 1966.
"The Marvelous Toy"	Chad Mitchell Trio	1963	Written by Tom Paxton. Peter, Paul & Mary released a version in 1969. A folk favorite, also recorded by The Irish Rovers and John Denver.
"Mary, Did You Know"	Kenny Rogers with Wynonna	1996	Lyrics written in 1984 by Mark Lowry. Buddy Greene composed the music in 1990. The song was first released on the album Michael English in 1992. Also a hit for Kathy Mattea (1993), Natalie Cole (1999), Reba McEntire (1999), Clay Aiken (2005), Michael Bublé, Pentatonix (2014), Jordan Smith, and others.
"Mary's Boy Child"	Harry Belafonte	1956	Written by Jester Hairston. Also a top 40 hit remake in the UK for Nina & Frederick in 1959, and a No. 1 hit remake in the UK for Boney M in 1978, as a medley titled "Mary's Boy Child/Oh My Lord".
"May Christmas Bring You Happiness"	Luther	1976	1970s R&B vocal quintet featuring Luther Vandross on lead vocals, along with former Shades of Jade members Anthony Hinton and Diane Sumler, Theresa V. Reed, and Christine Wiltshire.
"May You Always"	Harry Harrison	1965	Spoken-word recording accompanied by "Auld Lang Syne" as its instrumental backing that peaked at No. 26 on Billboard's Top Christmas Singles chart on the week ending December 25, 1965. Not to be confused with the popular song of the same title. Harrison was a New York City-based radio personality and disc jockey.
"Mele Kalikimaka (Merry Christmas)"	Bing Crosby with The Andrews Sisters	1950	This Hawaiian-themed Christmas song debuted on Billboard's Hot 100 chart at No. 36 on the week ending January 2, 2021. Also made these other Billboard music charts (with peak positions shown): Digital Song Sales (No. 47), Holiday 100 (No. 25), Holiday Digital Song Sales (No. 22), Holiday Streaming Songs (No. 22), Hot 100 Recurrents (No. 5), and Streaming Songs (No. 22).
"Mele Kalikimaka (Merry Christmas)"	Jimmy Buffett	1996	Peaked at No. 12 on Billboard's Holiday Digital Song Sales chart on the week ending December 25, 2010.
"Merry Christmas" (1)	Judy Garland	1949	Written by Janice Torre and Fred Spielman, for the 1949 MGM musical film In the Good Old Summertime. Later recorded by Johnny Mathis (2002) and Bette Midler (2006).
"Merry Christmas" (2)	Ed Sheeran & Elton John	2021	Written by Sheeran and John. Peaked at No. 1 for one week on Billboard's Adult Contemporary chart (on the week ending January 1, 2022) and at No. 38 on Billboard's main Hot 100 chart (on the week ending January 4, 2025, upon its third chart re-entry). Also made these other Billboard music charts (with peak positions shown): Adult Pop Airplay (No. 25), Digital Song Sales (No. 4), Global 200 (No. 14), Global 200 Excl. US (No. 7), Holiday 100 (No. 29), Holiday Digital Song Sales (No. 2), Holiday Streaming Songs (No. 27), LyricFind Global (No. 7), LyricFind U.S. (No. 25), Pop Airplay (No. 36), and Streaming Songs (No. 32).
"Merry Christmas (I Don't Want to Fight Tonight)"	The Ramones	1987	B-side of single "I Wanna Live".
"Merry Christmas, Baby"	Johnny Moore's Three Blazers	1947	The original version by Johnny Moore's Three Blazers peaked at No. 3 on Billboard magazine's R&B Juke Box chart during the Christmas season of 1947. Charles Brown was the singer and pianist of Johnny Moore's Three Blazers. Brown also recorded a hit solo remake of the song in 1956 and again in 1968. Other versions that also charted were by Chuck Berry in 1958, and by Otis Redding in 1968. Bruce Springsteen also recorded a live version from a 1980 concert (first released in 1986 as a B-side) that was made popular following its inclusion on the 1987 Special Olympics charity album A Very Special Christmas.
"Merry Christmas Darling"	The Carpenters	1970	Re-charted in 1971, 1972, 1973, and 1983. Re-released in 1978 with newly recorded vocals for their 1978 holiday album Christmas Portrait. Also a hit for Vanessa L. Williams in 2004.
"Merry Christmas Everybody"	Train	2015	Peaked at No. 10 on the Billboard Adult Contemporary chart. First recorded by the English rock band Slade in 1973. A version by the Radio City Rockettes received regional airplay, ranking No. 36 on the Star 102.5 chart.
"Merry Christmas from the Family"	Robert Earl Keen	1994	From the album Gringo Honeymoon. A version by Montgomery Gentry also charted at No. 38 on Hot Country Songs in 2001.
"Merry Christmas, Happy Holidays"	'N Sync	1998	Hit the Top 40 Mainstream chart in 1999.
"Merry Christmas in the NFL"	Buckner & Garcia	1980	Novelty song which imagined Howard Cosell as Santa Claus. Performed under the pseudonym "Willis the Guard & Vigorish", the song reached No. 82 on the Billboard charts, despite limited airplay after Cosell found the song offensive.
"Merry Christmas Strait to You"	George Strait	1986	First released on Strait's 1986 holiday album Merry Christmas Strait to You, but the title track didn't hit the Billboard Hot Country Singles chart until 1998.
"Merry Merry Christmas Baby"	Dodie Stevens	1960	Covered by Margo Sylvia in 1994.
"Merry Merry Merry Frickin' Christmas"	Frickin' A	2004	Two versions of the song. One is a tribute to the Boston Red Sox on their winning of the 2004 World Series. The other is a satire of spending time with the family.
"Merry Twistmas"	The Marcels	1961	Written to capitalize on the U.S. dance craze called "The Twist".
"Mistletoe" (1)	Colbie Caillat	2007	Peaked at No. 75 on the Billboard Hot 100 singles chart and No. 44 on the Billboard Pop 100 chart in late 2007, and No. 7 on the Billboard Hot Adult Contemporary Tracks chart in early 2008.
"Mistletoe" (2)	Justin Bieber	2011	Debuted and peaked at No. 11 on Billboard's Hot 100 singles chart (on the week ending November 5, 2011) and peaked at No. 2 on Billboard's Adult Contemporary chart (on the week ending January 7, 2012). Also made these other Billboard music charts (with peak positions shown): Digital Song Sales (No. 5), Global 200 (No. 16), Global 200 Excl. US (No. 17), Greatest of All Time Holiday 100 Songs (No. 17), Holiday 100 (No. 1), Holiday Airplay (No. 44), Holiday Digital Song Sales (No. 1), Holiday Streaming Songs (No. 5), LyricFind Global (No. 6), LyricFind U.S. (No. 17), Pop Airplay (No. 40), Ringtones (No. 19), Streaming Songs (No. 29), and TikTok Top 50 (No. 32).
"Mistletoe and Holly"	Frank Sinatra	1957	Written by Frank Sinatra, Doc Stanford & Hank Sanicola. Selected as the theme song for the 1960 Christmas Seals appeal.
"The Mistletoe and Me"	Isaac Hayes	1969	Charted again in 1973.
"Monsters' Holiday"	Bobby (Boris) Pickett and the Crypt-Kickers	1962	Similar to Pickett's No. 1 pop hit single from earlier in 1962, "Monster Mash". Peaked at #30 on the Hot 100.
"The More You Give (The More You'll Have)"	Michael Bublé	2015	Peaked at No. 19 on the Billboard Adult Contemporary chart in early 2016.
"Mr. Hankey the Christmas Poo"	South Park	1997	Song debuted in the South Park episode of the same name, has appeared in several others since.
"Must Be Santa"	Lorne Greene with the Jimmy Joyce Children's Choir	1966	Written by Hal Moore and Bill Fredricks. First recorded by Mitch Miller and the Gang in 1961. Also covered by Bob Dylan in 2009.
"My Boyfriend's Coming Home for Christmas"	Toni Wine	1963	Includes elements of "The First Noel". Charted one week on Billboard's Christmas Records Chart peaking at #22.
"My Christmas Card to You"	The Partridge Family	1971	Written by Tony Romeo. From the Billboard #1 Christmas album of 1971 A Partridge Family Christmas Card.
"My Favorite Things"	Herb Alpert & the Tijuana Brass	1968	Originally written for the 1959 Broadway musical The Sound of Music. Charted for Herb Alpert and the Tijuana Brass, reaching No. 7 on the Billboard Easy Listening chart, #35 on the Cash Box Top 100, and #45 on the Billboard Hot 100 in early 1969. Popular versions that charted include a minor hit for Lorrie Morgan in 1994, a version by the band Chicago in 2001, and Kenny G in 2005.
"My Mom and Santa Claus"	George Jones	1965	First released in 1962; charted for one week on the Billboard Christmas charts in 1965.
"My Only Wish (This Year)"	Britney Spears	2000	Reached No. 7 on the Christmas Songs chart.

== N ==
Title	Artist	Year	Additional information
"Natividad (Nativity)"	Harvie June Van	1967	First released on Briar Records in 1962. Re-issue on Kapp Records peaked at No. 15 on Billboard's Christmas Singles chart.
"New Year's Eve 1999"	Alabama with Gretchen Peters	1999	Peaked at No. 55 on Billboard's Hot Country Singles & Tracks chart in early 2000.
"A New York Christmas"	Rob Thomas	2003	Peaked at No. 22 on Billboard's Hot 100 Singles Sales chart.
"The Night Before Christmas" (1)	Milton Cross	1939	Peaked at No. 6 on Billboard's Best-Selling Children's Records chart in 1948. Recitation of Clement Moore's famous 1823 poem "A Visit from St. Nicholas" with musical background orchestrated by Victor Salon. Originally released in 1939. A version by Jim Brickman featuring John Oates peaked at No. 5 on Billboard's Adult Contemporary chart in 2014.
"The Night Before Christmas" (2)	Carly Simon	1992	Written and recorded by Simon for the 1992 film This Is My Life; also used in the 1994 film Mixed Nuts. Covered by Amy Grant in 1992.
"The Night Before Christmas Song"	Rosemary Clooney & Gene Autry	1952	Peaked at No. 9 on Billboard's Top Popular Records – Most Played by Jockeys chart in late December 1952. A recording of Clement Moore's famous 1823 poem "A Visit from St. Nicholas" featuring a melody written by Johnny Marks and orchestration by Carl Cotner.
"The Night Santa Went Crazy"	"Weird Al" Yankovic	1996	Parody of Greg Lake's "I Believe in Father Christmas" in the style of Soul Asylum's "Black Gold". Two versions were recorded.
"The Night was Anything but Silent"	Shiloh	2010	The late Dan Adkins collaborated in writing the song, "The Night Was Anything But Silent." It was later recorded by Jonathan White and Shiloh. The latter group also recorded a Latin version.
"Nina-Non"	Joni James	1953	Featuring orchestra and chorus conducted by Lew Douglas.
"Not Another Christmas Song"	Blink-182	2019	Written by bassist Mark Hoppus, guitarist Matt Skiba, drummer Travis Barker, who also produced the song. Lyrically, the narrative takes the typically high-spirited holiday celebrations into a metaphor for the passage of time, as well as a relationship falling apart. In the song, Hoppus laments that "depression's such a lonely business," describing a pairing in which one partner is consistently angry and the other is often apologizing. Peaked at number 16 on the Rock Digital Song Sales chart. Made an appearance at number 37 on the publication's Holiday Digital Song Sales chart in the week preceding Christmas.
"A Not So Merry Christmas"	Bobby Vee	1962	From the album Merry Christmas from Bobby Vee.
"The Nutcracker Suite"	Arthur Fiedler and the Boston Pops	1958	Also a hit for the Berlin Symphony Orchestra and many others around the world. Introduced in a stylized jazz-big band version by Les Brown in the 1957 album Concert Modern. Other hit rock versions by The Brian Setzer Orchestra and Trans-Siberian Orchestra. Latter's version retitled "A Mad Russian's Christmas".
"Nuttin' for Christmas"	Art Mooney and His Orchestra; Vocal by Barry Gordon	1955	Peaked at No. 6 on Billboard's Popular Records – Best Sellers in Stores chart in 1956. Versions by four other artists charted in December 1955 and early 1956 on one or more of Billboard's music popularity charts: Joe Ward, Ricky Zahnd & The Blue Jeaners (titled "(I'm Gettin') Nuttin' for Christmas"), The Fontane Sisters, and Stan Freberg. Written by Sid Tepper and Roy C. Bennett. Eartha Kitt released a version in 1955 with different lyrics titled "Nothin' for Christmas" with the same writer credits. Also covered by the rock group Smash Mouth.

== O ==
Title	Artist	Year	Additional information
"O Bambino (One Cold and Blessed Winter)"	Harry Simeone Chorale	1964	Peaked at No. 9 on Billboard's Christmas Singles chart. Charted again on the Christmas Singles chart and Billboard's Bubbling Under Hot 100 Singles chart in 1965. Introduced in 1961 by The Springfields as "Bambino (Napoli Lullaby)". Same melody as "Bagpiper's Carol" by The Mariners.
"O Come All Ye Faithful"	Twisted Sister	2006	Performed in the style of their hit "We're Not Gonna Take It", while staying faithful to the carol's original words and melody.
"O Holy Night"	John Berry	1995	Peaked at No. 55 on Billboard's Hot Country Singles & Tracks chart in 1996. A 19th-century French carol, originally titled "Cantique de Noël." First known recorded version was released in 1916 by Enrico Caruso. First appearance on a popular Christmas album was in 1946 by Fred Waring. Other charted versions were by Mariah Carey (1994), Martina McBride (1996), Celine Dion (1998), Josh Groban (2002), LeAnn Rimes (2003), Clay Aiken (2004), Carrie Underwood (2009), Newsboys (2010), and Richard Marx (2012). Dion's version was featured as the leading song to her popular 1998 album These Are Special Times.
"O Little Town Of Bethlehem"	Jo Stafford	1964	On her album, "The Joyful Season", it features Stafford accompanying herself as a vocal choir through the use of multitrack recording.
"O Tannenbaum"	Vince Guaraldi Trio	1965	Lyrics composed in 1824 by Ernst Anschütz. Recorded by Guaraldi for the soundtrack album to the 1965 animated holiday television special, A Charlie Brown Christmas. First entered Billboard's Holiday 100 chart at No. 50 (on the week ending December 10, 2011), peaking at No. 29 (on the week ending January 5, 2019). Also made these other Billboard music charts (with peak positions shown): Global 200 (No. 161), Greatest of All Time Holiday 100 Songs (No. 66), Holiday Airplay (No. 26), Holiday Streaming Songs (No. 26), Hot 100 Recurrents (No. 14), and Streaming Songs (No. 41).
"Oh Santa!"	Mariah Carey	2010	First single released from Carey's second holiday album, Merry Christmas II You. Spent four weeks at No. 1 on Billboard's Adult Contemporary chart in December 2010 and early 2011. Debuted at No. 1 on Billboard's Holiday Digital Songs chart on the week ending October 30, 2010.
"Oh Santa!"	Mariah Carey Featuring Ariana Grande & Jennifer Hudson	2020	New version of Carey's 2010 single released on the soundtrack to Mariah Carey's Magical Christmas Special. Made these Billboard music charts (with peak positions shown): Adult Contemporary (No. 17), Digital Song Sales (No. 3), Hot 100 (No. 76), Holiday 100 (No. 45), Holiday Digital Song Sales (No. 1), Hot R&B/Hip-Hop Songs (No. 20), R&B Digital Song Sales (No. 1), R&B Songs (No. 4), R&B Streaming Songs (No. 15), and R&B/Hip-Hop Digital Song Sales (No. 1).
"Oi to the World"	The Vandals	1996	Covered by No Doubt in 1997.
"An Old Christmas Card"	Jim Reeves	1963	First released by Ray Smith in 1949. Covered by Jim Reeves in 1963 from the album Twelve Songs of Christmas. Reached the Music Vendor Christmas chart the same year.
"The Old Man's Back in Town"	Garth Brooks	1992	Peaked at No. 48 on Billboard's Hot Country Singles & Tracks chart in 1993 (charted again on the same Billboard chart in 1998, peaking at No. 59). Included on Brooks's first holiday album, Beyond the Season.
"Old Time Christmas"	George Strait	1999	Peaked at No. 62 on Billboard's Hot Country Singles & Tracks chart in 2000.
"Old Toy Trains"	Roger Miller	1967	Peaked at No. 13 on Billboard's Christmas Singles chart. A 2000 version by Toby Keith peaked at No. 57 on Billboard's Hot Country Singles & Tracks chart in early 2001.
"One Wish (for Christmas)"	Whitney Houston	2003	Peaked at No. 23 on Billboard's Hot Adult Contemporary chart in 2004. Originally recorded by Freddie Jackson and included on his 1994 holiday album, Freddie Jackson at Christmas.
"Our Winter Love"	Bill Pursell	1963	Instrumental track that peaked at No. 9 on the Billboard Hot 100 singles chart and at No. 4 on Billboard's Middle-Road Singles chart in late March 1963, and at No. 20 on Billboard's Hot R&B Singles chart in April 1963. A vocal version by The Lettermen peaked at No. 16 on Billboard's Top 40 Easy Listening chart and No. 72 on Billboard's Hot 100 singles chart in February 1967.

== P ==
Title	Artist	Year	Additional information
"Paper Angels"	Jimmy Wayne	2003	Peaked at No. 18 on Billboard's Hot Country Singles & Tracks chart in early 2004.
"Parade of the Wooden Soldiers"	Vincent Lopez Orchestra	1922	The Vincent Lopez Orchestra version peaked at No. 3 on the pop singles chart in September 1922. Other charted versions include Carl Fenton's Orchestra (1922), and Paul Whiteman and His Orchestra (1923). Music written in 1897 by Leon Jessel and popularized by Nikita Balieff's 1920s musical revue La Chauve-Souris. A version by The Crystals was also included on Phil Spector's 1963 holiday album, A Christmas Gift for You from Philles Records.
"Peace on Earth/Little Drummer Boy"	David Bowie & Bing Crosby	1982	Originally performed on September 11, 1977, for Crosby's final holiday television special, Bing Crosby's Merrie Olde Christmas, and first released as a single in 1982. Appeared on Billboard's Hot 100 Singles Sales chart in 2000, 2001, 2003 and 2004, peaking at No. 43. A video clip of the performance from the Crosby television special became a holiday staple on MTV during the holiday season for much of the 1980s.
"Pick Out a Christmas Tree"	Dan + Shay	2021	Peaked at No. 77 on the Billboard Hot 100 chart and at No. 11 on the Billboard Hot Country Songs chart in December 2021. Also made these other Billboard music charts (with peak positions shown): Country Streaming Songs (No. 7), Holiday 100 (No. 46), and Holiday Streaming Songs (No. 33).
"Please Come Home for Christmas"	Charles Brown	1960	Peaked at No. 21 on Billboard's Hot R&B Sides chart on the week ending January 8, 1961, and at No. 76 on Billboard's Hot 100 chart on the week ending January 7, 1962. Also made Billboard's Christmas Singles chart each December from 1963 to 1970 and again in both 1972 and 1973, peaking at No. 1 on the week ending December 16, 1972. Written by Brown and Gene Redd.
"Please Come Home for Christmas"	The Uniques	1967	Peaked at No. 32 on Billboard's Christmas Singles chart on the week ending December 23, 1967.
"Please Come Home for Christmas"	Eagles	1978	Peaked at No. 18 on Billboard's Hot 100 chart (on the week ending January 6, 1979), and at No. 15 on Billboard's Adult Contemporary chart (on the week ending January 10, 1998). Also made these other Billboard music charts (with peak positions shown): Adult Pop Airplay (No. 31), Digital Song Sales (No. 74), Global 200 (No. 36), Global 200 Excl. US (No. 61), Greatest of All Time Holiday 100 Songs (No. 25), Heritage Rock (No. 37), Holiday 100 (No. 18), Holiday Airplay (No. 2), Holiday Digital Song Sales (No. 29), Holiday Streaming Songs (No. 24), Hot 100 Recurrents (No. 4), LyricFind Global (No. 2), LyricFind U.S. (No. 3), Rock Digital Song Sales (No. 8), Rock Streaming Songs (No. 3), and Streaming Songs (No. 26).
"Please Come Home for Christmas"	Gary Allan	1996	Debuted and peaked at No. 70 on Billboard's Hot Country Singles & Tracks chart on the week ending January 11, 1997.
"Please Come Home for Christmas"	Lee Roy Parnell	1996	Debuted and peaked at No. 71 on Billboard's Hot Country Singles & Tracks chart on the week ending January 11, 1997.
"Please Come Home for Christmas"	Willie Nelson	2003	Debuted and peaked at No. 50 on Billboard's Hot Country Singles & Tracks chart on the week ending January 3, 2004.
"Please Come Home for Christmas"	Josh Gracin	2005	Debuted and peaked at No. 51 on Billboard's Hot Country Songs chart on the week ending January 7, 2006.
"Please Come Home for Christmas"	Martina McBride	2011	Debuted and peaked at No. 51 on Billboard's Hot Country Songs chart on the week ending January 7, 2012.
"Please Come Home for Christmas"	Kelly Clarkson	2013	Peaked at No. 6 on Billboard's Adult Contemporary chart on the week ending January 4, 2014, and at No. 14 on Billboard's Holiday Digital Song Sales chart on the week ending November 16, 2013.
"Please, Daddy (Don't Get Drunk This Christmas)"	John Denver	1973	Peaked at No. 7 on Billboard's Christmas Singles chart in 1973, and at No. 69 on both the Billboard Hot 100 singles and Billboard's Hot Country Singles charts in early 1974. Written by Bill Danoff and Taffy Nivert. Recorded for Denver's Farewell Andromeda album; on original LP and single releases the song's title was displayed as simply "Please, Daddy". Re-recorded for Denver's Rocky Mountain Christmas album in 1975. The song has been covered by other artists, such as Alan Jackson (1993) and The Decemberists (2006).
"Please Uncle Sam (Send Back My Man)"	The Charmels	1966	An early Stax/Volt single, in which a lonely Christmas is expected due to the singer's lover being in Vietnam.
"Po' Folks' Christmas"	Bill Anderson and The Po' Boys	1968	Peaked at No. 18 on Billboard's Christmas Singles chart.
"Presents for Christmas"	Solomon Burke	1968	Released on the 1968 various artists holiday soul album Soul Christmas.
"Pretty Paper"	Roy Orbison	1963	Peaked at No. 15 on the Billboard Hot 100 singles chart and No. 10 on Billboard's Middle-Road Singles chart in 1964. Also charted on Billboard's Christmas Singles chart, peaking at No. 27. Written by Willie Nelson. The original recording by Orbison was arranged by Bill Justis, with orchestra and chorus conducted by Ivor Raymonde. A 2003 version by Kenny Chesney featuring Willie Nelson peaked at No. 45 on Billboard's Hot Country Singles & Tracks chart in 2004. Nelson himself released two versions: his original 1964 version (for RCA Records) and a re-recording in 1979 as the title track of his holiday album released that year.
"Put a Little Holiday in Your Heart"	LeAnn Rimes	1996	Peaked at No. 51 on Billboard's Hot Country Singles & Tracks chart in 1997. Single available only as a bonus CD with the purchase of Rimes's 1996 studio album Blue at Target stores during the 1996 holiday season.
"Put Christ Back Into Christmas"	Red Foley with The Anita Kerr Singers	1953	Peaked at No. 23 on the pop singles chart.

== R ==
Title	Artist	Year	Additional information
"The Real Meaning of Christmas"	Ray Conniff and The Singers	1965	Peaked at No. 19 on Billboard's Christmas Singles chart.
"Redneck 12 Days of Christmas"	Jeff Foxworthy	1995	Peaked at No. 18 on Billboard's Hot Country Singles & Tracks chart in 1996. Parody of the traditional English song "Twelve Days of Christmas". A 2000 song of the same name and concept by the Redneck Carollers is also attested.
"Reindeer Boogie"	Trisha Yearwood	1994	Peaked at No. 63 on Billboard's Hot Country Singles & Tracks chart in 1999. First recorded by Hank Snow in 1953.
"Remember Bethlehem"	Dee Mullins	1970	Peaked at No. 71 on Billboard's Hot Country Singles chart in 1971.
"Ring Out, Solstice Bells"	Jethro Tull	1976	From the album Songs from the Wood.
"Ring Those Christmas Bells"	Peggy Lee	1953	Written by Marvin Fisher and Gus Levene. Also recorded by Lawrence Welk (1957) and Fred Waring (1959).
"River"	Barry Manilow	2002	Peaked at No. 17 on Billboard's Adult Contemporary chart in 2003, and included on his 2002 holiday album, A Christmas Gift of Love. Also recorded by Sarah McLachlan (2006). Written and originally recorded by Joni Mitchell, whose original version is included on her 1971 non-holiday studio album, Blue.
"Rock and Roll Christmas"	George Thorogood & the Destroyers	1983	
"Rockin' Around the Christmas Tree"	Brenda Lee	1958	Written by Johnny Marks. First entered Billboard's Hot 100 singles chart at No. 64 (on the week ending December 18, 1960), originally peaking at No. 14 two weeks later. The single re-entered the Hot 100 chart 13 times (in 1961, 1962, and each year from 2014 to 2024). It first reached No. 2 on the Hot 100 chart dated December 28, 2019, becoming the single with the longest run to No. 2 since its initial chart appearance (at 59 years, one week, and three days). Between December 2019 and January 2023, the song was at No. 2 on the Hot 100 chart for nine nonconsecutive weeks, before reaching No. 1 for the first time on the week ending December 9, 2023, breaking the record for a single's first appearance on the Hot 100 chart to its ascent to No. 1 (just three days shy of 63 years). Also made these other Billboard music charts (with peak positions shown): Adult Contemporary (No. 16), Country Digital Song Sales (No. 1), Country Streaming Songs (No. 1), Digital Song Sales (No. 4), Global 200 (No. 2), Global 200 Excl. US (No. 3), Greatest of All Time Holiday 100 Songs (No. 2), Holiday 100 (No. 1), Holiday Airplay (No. 1), Holiday Digital Song Sales (No. 1), Holiday Streaming Songs (No. 1), Hot Country Songs (No. 62), LyricFind Global (No. 4), LyricFind U.S. (No. 6), Radio Songs (No. 17), Streaming Songs (No. 1), and TikTok Top 50 (No. 6). The B-side of Lee's original 1958 single (Decca 30776) is "Papa Noël", a holiday song written by Roy Botkin.
"Rockin' Around the Christmas Tree"	Alabama	1996	Peaked at No. 64 on the Billboard Hot Country Singles & Tracks chart on the week ending January 8, 2000.
"Rockin' Around the Christmas Tree"	LeAnn Rimes	2004	Peaked at No. 3 on the Billboard Adult Contemporary chart on the week ending January 8, 2005, and at No. 30 on the Billboard Holiday Airplay chart on the week ending November 27, 2010.
"Rockin' Around the Christmas Tree"	MercyMe	2005	Peaked at No. 25 on the Billboard Hot Adult Contemporary chart on the week ending January 7, 2006.
"Rockin' Little Christmas"	Carlene Carter	1995	Reached No. 66 on the Hot Country Singles chart. Covered by Brooks & Dunn in 2002.
"Rudolph, the Red-Nosed Reindeer"	Gene Autry & the Pinafores	1949	Spent eight weeks at No. 1 on Billboard's Children's Records chart from late November 1949 through mid January 1950. Also peaked at No. 1 on both Billboard's Best-Selling Pop Singles and Billboard's Country & Western Records Most Played by Folk Disk Jockeys charts in early 1950. Autry recorded an updated version of the song in 1957 that featured orchestration by Carl Cotner, which peaked at No. 70 on Billboard's Top 100 Sides chart. Covered by many artists through the years, including charted versions by Bing Crosby (1950), Spike Jones and his City Slickers (1950), Red Foley (1951), The Cadillacs (1957), Paul Anka (1960), The Chipmunks (1960), The Temptations (1968), and Alan Jackson (1996).
"Run Rudolph Run"	Chuck Berry	1958	First entered the Billboard Hot 100 singles chart at No. 90 on the week ending December 15, 1958, originally peaking at No. 69 two weeks later. Re-entered the Hot 100 chart at No. 45 on the week ending January 5, 2019, attaining an overall peak position of No. 10 on the week ending January 2, 2021 (following its third chart re-entry). Also made these other Billboard music charts (with peak positions shown): Digital Song Sales (No. 29), Global 200 (No. 22), Global 200 Excl. US (No. 58), Greatest of All Time Holiday 100 Songs (No. 37), Holiday 100 (No. 9), Holiday Airplay (No. 35), Holiday Digital Song Sales (No. 6), Holiday Streaming Songs (No. 6), Hot 100 Recurrents (No. 1), LyricFind Global (No. 17), LyricFind U.S. (No. 14), R&B Digital Song Sales (No. 2), R&B Streaming Songs (No. 1), R&B/Hip-Hop Digital Song Sales (No. 4), R&B/Hip-Hop Streaming Songs (No. 1), Rock Digital Song Sales (No. 3), Rock Streaming Songs (No. 1), and Streaming Songs (No. 6). The B-side of Berry's original single is another holiday tune, a cover of "Merry Christmas Baby," which also charted on the Hot 100 in December 1958, peaking at No. 71.
"Run Rudolph Run"	Luke Bryan	2008	Peaked at No. 42 on the Billboard Hot Country Songs chart on the week ending January 10, 2009.

== S ==
Title	Artist	Year	Additional information
"Same Old Lang Syne"	Dan Fogelberg	1980	Peaked at No. 9 on Billboard's main Hot 100 singles chart and at No. 8 on Billboard's Adult Contemporary chart in February 1981. Also made these other Billboard music charts (with peak positions shown): Digital Song Sales (No. 67), Holiday 100 (No. 97), Holiday Airplay (No. 11), Holiday Digital Song Sales (No. 3), LyricFind Global (No. 3), and LyricFind US (No. 4).
"Santa Baby"	Eartha Kitt with Henri René and his Orchestra	1953	Written by Tony Springer, Philip Springer, and Joan Javits. Peaked at No. 4 on Billboard's Best Selling Singles chart, at No. 6 on Billboard's Most Played by Jockeys chart, and at No. 13 on Billboard's Most Played in Juke Boxes chart in December 1953. First entered Billboard's main Hot 100 chart at No. 50 (on the week ending December 25, 2021), peaking at No. 20 (on the week ending January 6, 2024, following its second chart re-entry). Also made these other Billboard music charts (with peak positions shown): Digital Song Sales (No. 28), Global 200 (No. 27), Global 200 Excl. US (No. 64), Greatest of All Time Holiday 100 Songs (No. 30), Holiday 100 (No. 18), Holiday Digital Song Sales (No. 11), Holiday Streaming Songs (No. 6), LyricFind Global (No. 1), LyricFind U.S. (No. 3), R&B Digital Song Sales (No. 7), R&B Streaming Songs (No. 5), R&B/Hip-Hop Digital Song Sales (No. 13), R&B/Hip-Hop Streaming Songs (No. 5), Ringtones (No. 12), and Streaming Songs (No. 18). In 1954, Kitt recorded an updated version of the song with new lyrics (titled "This Year's Santa Baby").
"Santa Baby"	Madonna	1987	From the 1987 various artists compilation album A Very Special Christmas. First entered Billboard's Holiday 100 chart on the week ending December 17, 2011, peaking at position No. 44 the following week. Also made these other Billboard music charts (with peak positions shown): Holiday Airplay (No. 24) and Holiday Digital Song Sales (No. 46).
"Santa Baby"	Rev Run & The Christmas All Stars	1997	Peaked at No. 49 on Billboard's R&B/Hip-Hop Airplay chart on the week ending December 27, 1997. Features Mase, Puff Daddy, Snoop Doggy Dogg, Salt-N-Pepa, Onyx, and Keith Murray. Samples "Nappy Heads" by Fugees. From the 1997 various artists compilation album A Very Special Christmas 3.
"Santa Baby"	Kylie Minogue	2000	Made these Billboard music charts (with peak positions shown): Global 200 (No. 89), Global 200 Excl. US (No. 73), LyricFind Global (No. 1), and LyricFind U.S. (No. 1).
"Santa Baby"	Kellie Pickler	2007	Peaked at No. 33 on both Billboard's Hot Country Songs and Country Airplay charts on the week ending January 5, 2008.
"Santa Baby (Gimme, Gimme, Gimme)"	Willa Ford	2001	The lead single from the album MTV: TRL Christmas.
"Santa Bring My Baby Back (To Me)"	Elvis Presley	1957	Written by Aaron Schroeder and Claude DeMetruis.
"Santa Claus and His Old Lady"	Cheech & Chong	1971	Spoken comedy record. Reached #4 on the Billboard Christmas Singles chart in 1971 before peaking at a new high of #3 on that same chart the following year. Later hit #38 on the Billboard Mainstream Rock chart in 1997.
"The Santa Claus Boogie"	The Tractors	1994	Re-charted on the Hot Country Singles and Hot 100 charts (the group's only Hot 100 hit) in 1995. Features a spoken-word intro by Bill Byrge.
"Santa Claus Go Straight to the Ghetto"	James Brown	1968	Recharted in 1969. A new version from the album James Brown's Funky Christmas reached the R&B charts in 1998.
"Santa Claus Got Stuck in My Chimney"	Ella Fitzgerald	1950	
"Santa Claus Is Back in Town"	Elvis Presley	1957	Written by Jerry Leiber and Mike Stoller. A 1997 version by Dwight Yoakam peaked at No. 60 on Billboard's Hot Country Singles & Tracks chart in early 1998.
"Santa Claus Is Comin' (In a Boogie Woogie Choo Choo Train)"	The Tractors	1995	Reached No. 43 on the Country charts in 1996. Rewriting of the group's biggest hit, "Baby Likes to Rock It".
"Santa Claus Is Comin' to Town"	George Hall and the Hotel Taft Orchestra	1934	Written in 1933 by Haven Gillespie and J. Fred Coots. George Hall peaked at #12 on Billboard's popular singles chart with his version. Other notable hit versions were by The Crystals (1963), The Carpenters (1975), George Strait (1995), Lonestar (2000), Barry Manilow (2002) and Harry Connick Jr. (2003),
"Santa Claus Is Comin' to Town"	Bing Crosby and The Andrews Sisters	1947	The flip side to their "Jingle Bells" peaked at #22 on Billboard's popular singles chart.
"Santa Claus Is Comin' to Town"	The Four Seasons	1962	Peaked at #23 on the Hot 100.
"Santa Claus Is Comin' to Town"	The Jackson 5	1970	Their version peaked at #22 on the Holiday 100 in 2021. It originally hit No. 1 for 2 weeks on Billboard's Christmas Singles chart in 1970 and charted again in 1971 and 1973 with the flip side "Christmas Won't Be The Same This Year" also from the Jackson 5 Christmas Album.
"Santa Claus Is Comin' to Town"	Bruce Springsteen	1981	Recorded 'live' December 12, 1975 at C.W. Post College in Greenvale, New York. First released as a promotional single from the album In Harmony 2 in 1981. Springsteen had released it as the flip side to his 1985 single "My Hometown" when it peaked at #1 on the last Billboard Christmas Hits singles chart on December 28, 1985. The song peaked at #13 on the Holiday Songs chart in 2007. It has charted every week of the Holiday 100 since 2001 peaking at #16 in 2012.
"Santa Claus Is Comin' to Town"	Frank Sinatra with Cyndi Lauper	1992	From the album A Very Special Christmas 2. Peaked at #13 on Billboard's Holiday Songs chart in 2005.
"Santa Claus Is Comin' to Town"	Mariah Carey	1994	Peaked at #45 on the Holiday 100 in 2017.
"Santa Claus Is Comin' to Town"	Steve Tyrell	2002	Peaked at #13 on Billboard's Holiday Songs chart.
"Santa Claus Is Comin' to Town"	Michael Bublé	2011	Peaked at #35 on the Holiday 100 in 2012.
"Santa Claus Is Definitely Here to Stay"	James Brown	1970	Reached No. 7 on the Christmas Chart in 1970.
"Santa Claus Is Watching You"	Ray Stevens	1962	Peaked at #45 on the Billboard Hot 100. Featuring backing vocals by the Merry Melody Singers.
"Santa Claus Lane"	Hilary Duff	2002	Title track from the album Santa Claus Lane. Also used in the movie The Santa Clause 2.
"Santa Got Lost in Texas"	Jeff Carson	1996	Based on the melody of "The Eyes of Texas", with lyrics rewritten by Ken Darby. Originally recorded by Michael Landon in 1963 for the album Bonanza: Christmas on the Ponderosa.
"Santa, I'm Right Here"	Toby Keith	1995	Peaked at No. 50 on the Billboard Hot Country Singles chart.
"Santa Looked a Lot Like Daddy"	Buck Owens	1965	Reached No. 2 on the Pop charts in 1965. Charted again by Buck Owens in 1967, and by Garth Brooks in 1998.
"Santa Tell Me"	Ariana Grande	2014	Co-written by Grande. First entered Billboard's main Hot 100 chart at No. 65 on the week ending December 13, 2014, peaking at No. 5 on the week ending January 4, 2025 (following its fifth chart re-entry). Also made these other Billboard music charts (with peak positions shown): Adult Contemporary (No. 7), Adult Pop Airplay (No. 39), Digital Song Sales (No. 8), Global 200 (No. 5), Global 200 Excl. US (No. 4), Greatest of All Time Holiday 100 Songs (No. 19), Holiday 100 (No. 1), Holiday Airplay (No. 20), Holiday Digital Song Sales (No. 1), Holiday Streaming Songs (No. 1), Hot 100 Recurrents (No. 5), LyricFind Global (No. 4), LyricFind U.S. (No. 15), Pop Airplay (No. 39), Streaming Songs (No. 6), TikTok Top 50 (No. 44), Top Triller Global (No. 11), and Top Triller U.S. (No. 3).
"Santa's a Fat Bitch"	Insane Clown Posse	1994	Debuted and peaked at No. 67 on Billboard's main Hot 100 chart on the week ending December 27, 1997. Only entry on the Hot 100 chart by this group.
"Santa's Coming for Us"	Sia	2017	Written by Sia and Greg Kurstin, and included on Sia's 2017 holiday album, Everyday Is Christmas. Peaked at No. 1 for three consecutive weeks on Billboard's Adult Contemporary chart (from mid December 2017 to early January 2018). Also made these other Billboard music charts (with peak positions shown): Adult Pop Airplay (No. 40), Bubbling Under Hot 100 (No. 11), Global 200 (No. 99), Global 200 Excl. US (No. 68), Holiday 100 (No. 51), Holiday Digital Song Sales (No. 9), and Holiday Streaming Songs (No. 34).
"Santa's Gonna Come in a Pickup Truck"	Redneck Carollers	2000	Originally recorded by Alan Jackson and Alvin and the Chipmunks in 1993. The song is a redneck style parody of "The Chipmunk Song".
"Santa's Got a Semi"	Keith Harling	1999	From the album Bring It On. Re-charted in 2000 from the various artists album A Christmas Collection.
"Santa's Little Helper Dingo"	Dingo	1973	Peaked at #11 on Billboard's Christmas Chart 12/22/1973.
"Save the Best for Last (Christmas version)"	Vanessa L. Williams	1992	Previously a No. 1 U.S. hit for 5 weeks as a non-holiday single, was reworked with a new snowy theme and wintry music video, popular on MTV for many years.
"Season of Love"	98 Degrees	2017	Peaked at No. 18 on Billboard's Adult Contemporary chart.
"The Secret of Christmas"	Bing Crosby	1959	Written by Sammy Cahn and Jimmy Van Heusen. Performed by Crosby in the 1959 film Say One for Me. Crosby re-recorded the song in 1964 for the album 12 Songs of Christmas. Other versions recorded by Ella Fitzgerald (1959), Johnny Mathis (1963), Julie Andrews (1973).
"Sending You a Little Christmas"	Jim Brickman featuring Kristy Starling	2003	Peaked at No. 1 on the Billboard Hot Adult Contemporary Tracks chart during the Christmas season of 2003.
"Shake Hands with Santa Claus"	Louis Prima & His Orchestra	1951	
"Shake Up Christmas"	Train	2010	Peaked at No. 12 on Billboard's Hot Adult Contemporary Tracks chart.
"Silent Night"	Bing Crosby	1935	Written on Christmas Eve 1818 in Germany by Franz Gruber under the title "Stille Nacht, heilige Nacht". Early popular recordings were made by The Haydn Quartet in 1905 under the title "Silent Night, Hallowed Night", Ernestine Schumann-Heink in 1908, Elsie Baker in 1912 as "Silent Night, Hallowed Night" and The Neapolitan Trio in 1917 as "Silent Night, Holy Night". Paul Whiteman and His Orchestra 1928's "Silent Night, Holy Night (Melodies Pt 1)" featured uncredited baritone vocals by Bing Crosby. Crosby's original hit version with the Victor Young Orchestra and backing vocals by the Guardsmen Quartet peaked at #7 on Billboard's popular singles chart. Crosby re-recorded the song in 1942 along with his new single, "White Christmas". After these master recordings were worn out by Decca Records, Crosby re-recorded both in 1947 which are the versions featured now on his classic album Merry Christmas. One of the most widely recorded Christmas songs, other charted versions were recorded by Mariah Carey (1994), Kenny Chesney (2004), MercyMe (2004), Peter Cetera (2005), Josh Groban (2007),
"Silent Night"	The Ravens	1948	Peaked at #5 on Billboard's R&B Chart.
"Silent Night"	Sister Rosetta Tharpe	1949	Peaked at #6 on Billboard's R&B Chart.
"Silent Night"	Mahalia Jackson	1962	Peaked at #5 on Billboard's Best Bets for Christmas as "Silent Night (Christmas Hymn)".
"Silent Night"	Barbra Streisand	1966	Peaked at #1 for 1 week under the title "Sleep in Heavenly Peace" on Billboard's Best Bets for Christmas. The same version appears on A Christmas Album that she released the following year.
"Silent Night"	The Temptations	1969	The Temptations charted two versions of this song. The first version from The Temptations Christmas Card peaked at #7 on Billboard's Best Bets for Christmas. Their version from 1980's Give Love at Christmas peaked at #9 on the Christmas Hits chart in 1985. The song peaked at #27 on the Holiday 100 in 2014. The 1980 version is the one typically heard on radio stations today.
"Silent Night"	Mannheim Steamroller	1984	Titled "Stille Nacht" on their classic 1984 album, Christmas, the song charted at #23 on Billboard's Holiday Songs chart in 2002.
"Silent Night"	Enya	1988	Recorded as "Oiche Chium", the single first charted in the U.S. peaking at No. 117 on Billboard's Bubbling Under Hot 100 Singles chart in 1995. Also charted on Billboard's Hot 100 Singles Sales chart in 2000, 2002, 2003 and 2004, peaking at No. 11. The classic 1818 Franz Gruber carol sung in Gaelic. Originally released as a B-side of Enya's 1988 single, "Evening Falls". Later released as the main track on a three-song EP in 1994, which was also the best-selling Christmas single in the U.S. for 10 years (1994–2004).
"Silent Night"	Christina Aguilera	2000	Featured on the various artist compilation Platinum Christmas under the title "Silent Night/Noche De Paz". The song peaked at #8 on Billboard's Holiday Songs chart in 2001.
"Silent Night"	Kelly Clarkson Featuring Reba McEntire & Trisha Yearwood	2011	Peaked at #16 on Billboard's Holiday 100 in 2014.
"Silent Night"	Pentatonix	2014	Peaked at #21 on Billboard's Holiday 100.
"Silver and Gold"	Burl Ives	1964	Written for the classic 1964 TV special, Rudolph, the Red-Nosed Reindeer.
"Silver Bells"	Bing Crosby & Carole Richards	1950	Written by Jay Livingston and Ray Evans, and later used in the 1951 film The Lemon Drop Kid starring Bob Hope. Other popular versions were also recorded by Johnny Mathis (1958), Doris Day (1964), Jo Stafford (1964), Al Martino (1964), The Supremes (1965), Kate Smith (1966), Earl Grant (1966), Kenny G (1994), Kimberley Locke (2003), Kenny Chesney (2004), Lady Antebellum (2011), and Whitney Wolanin (2014).
"Six Tons of Toys"	Paul Brandt	1998	New lyrics to Dave Dudley's 1963 hit "Six Days on the Road". Reached No. 66 on the Hot Country Singles chart in 1999.
"Sleigh Ride"	Arthur Fiedler and the Boston Pops	1949	Original instrumental recording; debuted and peaked at No. 24 on the Billboard Best-Selling Pop Singles chart on the week ending December 16, 1949. Written in 1946, it was also recorded in 1950 by the song's composer, Leroy Anderson. A popular 1958 version by Johnny Mathis (backed by the Percy Faith Orchestra) was an early recording of the vocal version, with lyrics written by Mitchell Parrish.
"Sleigh Ride"	The Ronettes	1963	From the 1963 holiday album A Christmas Gift for You from Phil Spector. First entered Billboard's Hot 100 chart at No. 41 on the week ending December 22, 2018, peaking at No. 8 on the week ending December 23, 2023 (following its fifth chart re-entry). Also made these other Billboard music charts (with peak positions shown): Global 200 (No. 12), Global 200 Excl. US (No. 14), Greatest of All Time Holiday 100 Songs (No. 13), Holiday 100 (No. 7), Holiday Airplay (No. 8), Holiday Digital Song Sales (No. 7), Holiday Streaming Songs (No. 6), R&B Digital Song Sales (No. 5), R&B Streaming Songs (No. 1), R&B/Hip-Hop Digital Song Sales (No. 9), R&B/Hip-Hop Streaming Songs (No. 1), Radio Songs (No. 39), Streaming Songs (No. 8), and TikTok Top 50 (No. 3).
"Sleigh Ride"	Dolly Parton	1984	Medley with "Winter Wonderland"; peaked at No. 6 on the Billboard Christmas Hits - Singles chart on the week ending December 22, 1984.
"Sleigh Ride"	TLC	1992	Peaked at No. 42 on the Billboard R&B Radio Monitor chart and at No. 43 on the Billboard Hot 100 Airplay chart on the week ending January 9, 1993. From the 1992 film Home Alone 2: Lost in New York and later included on the 1993 holiday compilation album, A LaFace Family Christmas.
"Sleigh Ride"	Lorrie Morgan	1993	Peaked at No. 42 on the Billboard Hot Country Singles & Tracks chart on the week ending January 8, 2000.
"Sleigh Ride"	Garth Brooks	1999	Peaked at No. 54 on the Billboard Hot Country Singles & Tracks chart on the week ending January 8, 2000.
"Slipping Into Christmas"	Leon Russell	1972	B-side is "Christmas In Chicago".
"Snoopy's Christmas"	The Royal Guardsmen	1967	The third in a series of "Snoopy vs. the Red Baron" songs by the group. Reached No. 10 in Cashbox's pop chart, No. 1 in the Billboard Christmas chart. Re-charted in 1968 and 1969.
"Snow"	Claudine Longet	1967	The B-side of Longet's single "I Don't Intend to Spend Christmas Without You". Charted for two weeks on the Billboard Christmas chart.
"Snowbound for Christmas"	The DeCastro Sisters	1955	Arranged by Skip Martin. Also recorded by Jackie Gleason in 1967. B-side is "Christmas Is A-Comin'".
"Snowfall"	Claude Thornhill and His Orchestra	1941	Written by Claude Thornhill. Later recorded by Billy May, Tony Bennett, Henry Mancini, Doris Day and many others.
"Snow Flake"	Jim Reeves	1966	Charted on both the Hot Country Singles and Hot 100 charts.
"Snowflakes of Love"	Toni Braxton	2001	The lead single from Toni Braxton's Christmas album Snowflakes. Includes elements of Isaac Hayes' composition "Now We're One".
"Snowman"	Sia	2017	Written by Sia and Greg Kurstin, and included on Sia's 2017 holiday album, Everyday Is Christmas. Debuted and peaked at No. 43 on Billboard's main Hot 100 chart (on the week ending January 4, 2025). Also made these other Billboard music charts (with peak positions shown): Digital Song Sales (No. 15), Global 200 (No. 11), Global 200 Excl. US (No. 4), Holiday 100 (No. 32), Holiday Digital Song Sales (No. 3), Holiday Streaming Songs (No. 31), LyricFind Global (No. 14), LyricFind U.S. (No. 4), Streaming Songs (No. 39), and TikTok Top 50 (No. 26).
"SnowTime"	James Taylor	2015	Peaked at No. 19 on the Billboard Adult Contemporary chart.
"Someday at Christmas"	Stevie Wonder	1966	Debuted and peaked at No. 24 on Billboard's Best Selling Christmas Singles chart on the week ending December 17, 1966. Also made these other Billboard music charts (with peak positions shown): Adult R&B Airplay (No. 33), Global 200 (No. 157), Holiday 100 (No. 56), Holiday Airplay (No. 29), Holiday Digital Song Sales (No. 17), R&B Digital Song Sales (No. 11), and R&B/Hip-Hop Digital Song Sales (No. 16).
"Someday at Christmas"	Mary J. Blige	1999	Debuted and peaked at No. 87 on Billboard's Hot R&B/Hip-Hop Singles & Tracks chart on the week ending January 8, 2000.
"Someday at Christmas"	Jordan Hill	2012	Peaked at No. 11 on Billboard's Adult Contemporary chart on the week ending December 15, 2012.
"Someday at Christmas"	Stevie Wonder and Andra Day	2015	Debuted and peaked at No. 60 on Billboard's Holiday 100 chart on the week ending December 19, 2015. Also made these other Billboard music charts (with peak positions shown): Adult R&B Airplay (No. 23), Holiday Digital Song Sales (No. 2), Hot R&B Songs (No. 24), R&B Digital Song Sales (No. 5), and R&B/Hip-Hop Digital Song Sales (No. 12).
"Someday at Christmas"	Lizzo	2022	Peaked at No. 59 on Billboard's Hot 100 chart on the week ending December 31, 2022. Also made these other Billboard music charts (with peak positions shown): Adult Contemporary (No. 18), Global 200 (No. 79), Global 200 Excl. US (No. 165), Holiday 100 (No. 39), Holiday Streaming Songs (No. 36), Hot R&B Songs (No. 9), Hot R&B/Hip-Hop Songs (No. 15), R&B Streaming Songs (No. 12), R&B/Hip-Hop Streaming Songs (No. 15), and Streaming Songs (No. 49).
"Someone Is Missing at Christmas"	Anne Cochran	2005	Peaked at No. 11 on the Hot Adult Contemporary Tracks. From the album This is the Season.
"Song for a Winter's Night"	Sarah McLachlan	1994	Written and originally recorded in 1966 by Canadian singer/songwriter Gordon Lightfoot for his 1967 album The Way I Feel. McLachlan's version of the song was recorded in 1994 and first appeared on the soundtrack to that year's remake of Miracle on 34th Street. McLachlan also included her version on her 2006 holiday album Wintersong.
Songs of Christmas	Bobby Vinton	1963	This is the only EP to chart Billboard's Christmas singles chart, peaking at #9 on 12/14/1963. The EP contains the songs "Silver Bells", "White Christmas", "O Holy Night" and "The Christmas Song".
"The Sound of Christmas"	Ramsey Lewis Trio	1961	
"St. Brick Intro"	Gucci Mane	2016	Peaked at No. 29 on the Billboard's Holiday 100
"The Star"	Mariah Carey	2017	Peaked at No. 6 on the Billboard Holiday Digital Song Sales chart in November 2017, and at No. 23 on the Billboard Adult Contemporary chart in early 2018.
"Step Into Christmas"	Elton John	1973	The B-side is another holiday tune by Elton titled "Ho Ho Ho (Who'd Be a Turkey at Christmas)". The British indie-rock band The Wedding Present recorded a cover of "Step Into Christmas" that appeared on the 1991 various artists holiday compilation A Lump of Coal.
"Suzy Snowflake"	Rosemary Clooney	1951	Written by Sid Tepper and Roy C. Bennett
"(Sweet Angie) The Christmas Tree Angel"	Fran Allison	1950	Debuted and peaked at No. 14 on Billboard's Best Selling Children's Records chart on the week ending January 6, 1951.
"Sweet Little Baby Boy"	James Brown	1966	Released as a two-part single, it reached No. 8 on Billboard's Christmas Singles chart in 1966. Also appeared in the Record World top 100 pop chart.
"A Swingin' Little Christmas"	Jane Lynch featuring Kate Flannery & Tim Davis with The Tony Guerrero Quintet	2016	Peaked at No. 10 on the Billboard Adult Contemporary chart in early 2018.

== T ==
Title	Artist	Year	Additional information
"Take Me Back to Toyland"	Nat King Cole	1955	Peaked at No. 47 on Billboard's Top 100 Popular Records chart in 1956. Featuring the Nelson Riddle Orchestra and Chorus.
"Take Me Home for Christmas"	Dan + Shay	2020	Peaked at No. 2 on Billboard's Hot Country Songs chart on the week ending January 2, 2021. Also made these other Billboard music charts (with peak positions shown): Country Airplay (No. 37), Country Digital Song Sales (No. 4), Country Streaming Songs (No. 7), Digital Song Sales (No. 15), Holiday 100 (No. 25), Global 200 (No. 82), Holiday Digital Song Sales (No. 3), Holiday Streaming Songs (No. 26), Hot 100 (No. 48), and Streaming Songs (No. 29).
"Tennessee Christmas"	Amy Grant	1983	Covered by Alabama in 1985, Steve Wariner in 1990, among other country and Contemporary Christian artists.
"Thank God for Kids"	Oak Ridge Boys	1982	Peaked at No. 3 for two weeks on Billboard's Hot Country Singles chart in early 1983. A 2003 version by Kenny Chesney peaked at No. 60 on Billboard's Hot Country Singles & Tracks chart in early 2004.
"Thank God It's Christmas"	Queen	1984	
"Thanks for Christmas"	XTC	1983	
"That Holiday Feeling"	Steve and Eydie	1964	A 1998 cover by Michael Civisca and Mary Stahl was a regional hit in the Buffalo, New York area.
"That's Christmas to Me"	Pentatonix	2014	Peaked at No. 3 on Billboard's Adult Contemporary chart.
"That's What I Want for Christmas"	Nancy Wilson	1963	Lyrics and music by Irving Caesar and Gerald Marks. Peaked at No. 6 on Billboard's Christmas Singles chart. Charted again in 1964. Featuring orchestra by O.B. Masingill. The flip side is her version of "What Are You Doing New Year's Eve" that peaked at # 17 in 1963.
"There Is No Christmas Like a Home Christmas"	Perry Como	1968	Originally recorded by Como in 1950. Re-recorded version peaked at No. 28 on Billboard's Christmas Singles chart in 1968. Featuring orchestration by Nick Perito and the Ray Charles Singers on backing vocals.
"There Won't Be Any Snow (Christmas in the Jungle)"	Derrik Roberts	1965	Peaked at No. 8 on Billboard's Christmas Singles chart in 1965, and at No. 105 on Billboard's Bubbling Under Hot 100 Singles chart in 1966. Included on the 1998 Westside Records compilation, Christmas Past.
"(There's No Place Like) Home for the Holidays"	Perry Como	1954	Featuring accompaniment by the Mitchell Ayres Orchestra and the Ray Charles Singers. Peaked at No. 8 on the Billboard Most Played by Jockeys chart on the week ending December 29, 1954, and at No. 18 on the Billboard Best Sellers in Stores chart one week earlier. A second recording of the song by Como with the same backing accompaniment as the 1954 original was released in 1959. First entered the Billboard Hot 100 chart on the week ending December 29, 2018, peaking at No. 22 on the week ending January 2, 2021, following its second chart re-entry. Also made these other Billboard music charts (with peak positions shown): Global 200 (No. 61), Holiday 100 (No. 13), Holiday Airplay (No. 14), Holiday Digital Song Sales (No. 50), Holiday Streaming Songs (No. 10), Hot 100 Recurrents (No. 8), and Streaming Songs (No. 18).
"(There's No Place Like) Home for the Holidays"	Garth Brooks	1999	Peaked at No. 63 on the Billboard Hot Country Singles & Tracks chart on the week ending January 8, 2000.
"(There's No Place Like) Home for the Holidays"	Cyndi Lauper & Norah Jones	2011	Peaked at No. 11 on the Billboard Adult Contemporary chart on the week ending January 7, 2012.
"Thirty-Two Feet – Eight Little Tails"	Gene Autry	1951	Peaked at No. 5 on Billboard's Best Selling Children's Records chart. Featuring orchestration by Carl Cotner.
"This Christmas" (1)	Donny Hathaway	1970	Peaked at No. 11 on Billboard's Christmas Singles chart (on the week ending December 23, 1972). First entered Billboard's main Hot 100 chart at No. 39 (on the week ending January 2, 2021), peaking at No. 34 (on the week ending January 6, 2024, one week following its second chart re-entry). Also made these other Billboard music charts (with peak positions shown): Global 200 (No. 52), Global 200 Excl. US (No. 140), Greatest of All Time Holiday 100 Songs (No. 49), Holiday 100 (No. 25), Holiday Digital Song Sales (No. 32), Holiday Streaming Songs (No. 27), Hot 100 Recurrents (No. 10), LyricFind Global (No. 13), LyricFind U.S. (No. 21), R&B Digital Song Sales (No. 5), R&B Streaming Songs (No. 6), R&B/Hip-Hop Digital Song Sales (No. 12), R&B/Hip-Hop Streaming Songs (No. 6), Radio Songs (No. 38), and Streaming Songs (No. 27).
"This Christmas" (1)	Richard Kincaid featuring Cuba Gooding, Sr.	2012	Peaked at No. 9 on Billboard's Adult Contemporary chart on the week ending December 15, 2012.
"This Christmas" (1)	Seal	2015	Peaked at No. 1 on Billboard's Adult Contemporary chart on the week ending January 2, 2016.
"This Christmas" (1)	Train	2016	Spent two nonconsecutive weeks at No. 1 on Billboard's Adult Contemporary chart in December 2016.
"This Christmas" (2)	Nelson featuring Alyssa Bonagura	2015	Peaked at No. 17 on the Billboard Adult Contemporary chart.
"This Gift"	98°	1999	Peaked at No. 49 on the Billboard Hot 100 singles chart and at No. 6 on Billboard's Adult Contemporary chart in early 2000.
"This Is Your Gift"	John Tesh	2002	Peaked at No. 19 on Billboard's Adult Contemporary chart. From the album Christmas Worship.
"This One's for the Children"	New Kids on the Block	1989	Peaked at No. 7 on the Billboard Hot 100 singles chart, No. 27 on Billboard's Adult Contemporary chart and No. 55 on Billboard's Hot Black Singles chart in 1990. The single also included "Funky, Funky Xmas," from the group's holiday album Merry, Merry Christmas, as a second track.
"This Time of the Year"	Brook Benton	1959	Written by Clyde Otis and Brook Benton. Peaked at No. 66 on the Billboard Hot 100 singles chart in 1959, and No. 12 on Billboard's Hot R&B Sides chart in 1960. Featuring orchestration by Belford Hendricks. Another version by Brenda Lee charted in 1964, peaking at No. 12 on Billboard's Christmas Singles chart.
"'Til Santa's Gone (Milk and Cookies)"	Clint Black	1995	Peaked at No. 58 on Billboard's Hot Country Singles & Tracks in 1996. Originally released in 1990 as a single, and on the albums Home for the Holidays and A Season of Harmony with the title "Til' Santa's Gone (I Just Can't Wait)".
"Time Passages"	Al Stewart	1978	The most popular song on the Billboard Adult Contemporary Charts in 1978 and 1979. Though released in December 1978 with a theme of going home for Christmas, the song has largely lost its association with Christmas over the years and is now aired more often in general recurrent rotation (in classic hits formats) than in Christmas rotations.
"Toyland"	Doris Day	1964	From The Doris Day Christmas Album. Based on the Victor Herbert operetta Babes in Toyland. Also popular as an instrumental by countless artists.
"Trains and Winter Rains"	Enya	2008	Peaked at No. 27 on Billboard's Adult Contemporary chart. Included on Enya's 2008 album, And Winter Came....
"'Twas the Night After Christmas"	Jeff Foxworthy	1996	Peaked at No. 67 on Billboard's Hot Country Singles & Tracks chart in 1997. Parody of the famous 1823 poem written by Clement Moore.
"'Twas the Night Before Christmas (A Visit from St. Nicholas)"	Fred Waring and His Pennsylvanians	1942	A recording of Clement Moore's famous 1823 poem set to music by Ken Darby and orchestration by Harry Simeone, it first charted on Billboard's Best Selling Children's Records chart in 1949, peaking at No. 11, and again in 1952, peaking at No. 6. This first recording by Waring was released around Christmastime of 1942 on the 4-record album set, 'Twas The Night Before Christmas. He went on to record it two more times; again for Decca Records in 1955, and a third and final time for Capitol Records in stereo in 1963. This 1963 recording became the most famous of the poem's musical adaptations. The song also charted by Arthur Godfrey with backing orchestration by Archie Bleyer on Billboard's Best Selling Children's Records chart in 1950.
"The Twelve Days of Christmas"	Mitch Miller and the Gang	1961	One of the most recorded songs each year. First known recorded version was by Bing Crosby and The Andrews Sisters in 1949. The comedy duo of Bob & Doug McKenzie recorded a parody of this song in 1981. Other popular parodies that still receive airplay on radio stations around the holiday season include a version by The Muppets and John Denver (from their 1979 television special A Christmas Together), "The Twelve Pains of Christmas" by the Bob Rivers Comedy Corp (1987), and "Redneck 12 Days of Christmas" by Jeff Foxworthy (1995). During the Christmas season of 2008, a comical a cappella version by Straight No Chaser reached No. 5 on Billboard's Adult Contemporary chart.
"The Twelve Gifts of Christmas"	Allan Sherman	1963	Peaked at No. 5 on Billboard's Christmas Singles chart. Comical parody version of the traditional English carol, "The Twelve Days of Christmas".
"25th of Last December"	Roberta Flack	1977	Peaked at No. 28 on Billboard's Easy Listening chart and No. 52 on Billboard's Hot Soul Singles chart in 1978. Written by Gene McDaniels. Originally recorded for the 1977 album Blue Lights in the Basement. Flack re-recorded the song for her 1997 holiday album, The Christmas Album.
"2000 Miles"	The Pretenders	1983	Originally released as the B-side of the band's 1983 single "Middle of the Road", and then included on the band's 1984 album Learning to Crawl. Also covered by Holly Cole in 1989, and recorded by Coldplay in 2003 as a download single for charity.
"Twinkle Twinkle Little Me"	The Supremes	1965	Peaked at No. 5 on Billboard's Christmas Singles chart. Charted again in 1966 and 1967.
"Twistin' Bells"	Santo & Johnny	1960	Peaked at No. 49 on the Billboard Hot 100 singles chart. "Twist-rock" version of "Jingle Bells".

== U ==
Title	Artist	Year	Additional information
Under the Mistletoe"	Kelly Clarkson & Brett Eldredge	2020	Peaked at No. 34 on Billboards Holiday 100 in 2020.
"Underneath the Tree"	Kelly Clarkson	2013	Written by Clarkson and Greg Kurstin. Spent four consecutive weeks at No. 1 on Billboard's Adult Contemporary chart (from the week ending December 14, 2013, to the week ending January 4, 2014). First entered Billboard's main Hot 100 chart at No. 92 on the week ending December 21, 2013, peaking at No. 9 on the week ending January 4, 2025 (following its seventh chart re-entry). Also made these other Billboard music charts (with peak positions shown): Digital Song Sales (No. 15), Global 200 (No. 6), Global 200 Excl. US (No. 9), Greatest of All Time Holiday 100 Songs (No. 22), Holiday 100 (No. 8), Holiday Airplay (No. 24), Holiday Digital Song Sales (No. 3), Holiday Streaming Songs (No. 7), Hot 100 Recurrents (No. 3), LyricFind Global (No. 12), LyricFind U.S. (No. 22), and Streaming Songs (No. 7).
"Up on the House Top"	Kimberley Locke	2005	Spent four weeks at No. 1 on Billboard's Adult Contemporary chart in December 2005 and early 2006. First released by Gene Autry and the Cass County Boys in 1953, and re-recorded by Autry for his 1957 holiday album, Rudolph, the Red-Nosed Reindeer & other Christmas Favorites.

== W ==
Title	Artist	Year	Additional information
"Warm & Fuzzy"	Billy Gilman	2000	Peaked at No. 50 on Billboard's Hot Country Singles & Tracks chart in 2001.
"We Need a Little Christmas"	Percy Faith, His Orchestra & Chorus	1966	Peaked at No. 24 on Billboard's Holiday Airplay chart (week ending December 10, 2005) and at No. 73 on Billboard's Holiday 100 chart (week ending December 13, 2014). Originally from the Broadway musical production Mame, originated by Angela Lansbury; Lucille Ball recorded the film version in 1973.
"We Need a Little Christmas"	Kimberley Locke	2008	Peaked at No. 19 on Billboard's Adult Contemporary chart on the week ending January 3, 2009.
"We Need a Little Christmas"	Glee Cast	2010	Peaked at No. 15 on Billboard's Adult Contemporary chart (week ending December 25, 2010) and at No. 16 on Billboard's Holiday Digital Songs Sales chart (week ending December 4, 2010).
"We Three Kings (Star of Wonder)"	BlackHawk	1997	Peaked at No. 75 on Billboard's Hot Country Singles & Tracks chart in 1998. Composed by John Henry Hopkins in 1857.
"We Wish You a Merry Christmas"	Kenny G	2005	Peaked at No. 15 on Billboard's Adult Contemporary. Recorded by dozens of artists over the years, but Kenny G's 2005 recording was the first version to make any of Billboard's music charts.
"Welcome Christmas"	The Who Village Choir	1966	Written for the 1966 Dr. Seuss TV classic How the Grinch Stole Christmas!.
"What Are You Doing New Year's Eve?"	The Orioles	1949	Peaked at No. 9 on Billboard's Best-Selling Retail Rhythm & Blues chart. Written by Frank Loesser. First recorded by Margaret Whiting in 1947. Other charted versions include Danté & The Evergreens (1960), and Nancy Wilson (1965). Recorded by many other artists, including Dick Haymes & the Les Paul Trio (1947), Ella Fitzgerald (1960), Ramsey Lewis Trio (1960), King Curtis (1968), Johnny Mathis (1969), Patti LaBelle (1990), The Stylistics (1992), Harry Connick, Jr. (1993), Barbra Streisand (2001) and Diana Krall (2005).
"What Can You Get a Wookiee for Christmas (When He Already Owns a Comb?)"	The Star Wars Intergalactic Droid Choir & Chorale	1980	Peaked at No. 69 on the Billboard Hot 100 singles chart. A novelty record featuring Star Wars' Chewbacca and included on the 1980 holiday album, Christmas in the Stars. The artist is actually disco producer Meco Monardo.
"What Child Is This?"	Mark Chesnutt	1996	Peaked at No. 75 on Billboard's Hot Country Singles & Tracks chart in 1997. Included on the 1996 various artists album A Country Christmas. Traditional 16th century English melody, known as "Greensleeves". Lyrics written in the 19th century by William Chatterton Dix. Also charted by Carrie Underwood (2009).
"What Christmas Means to Me"	Stevie Wonder	1967	From the album Someday at Christmas. Later versions were recorded by Paul Young (1992), Hanson (1997), Al Green (2004), and Jessica Simpson (2004). In 2021, John Legend released a duet with Stevie Wonder that charted at #34 on the Holiday 100.
"What Does Christmas Mean?"	Louis York featuring The Shindellas	2017	Peaked at No. 30 on the Billboard Adult Contemporary chart in 2018.
"What Will Santa Claus Say (When He Finds Everybody Swingin'?)"	Louis Prima and his New Orleans Gang	1936	
"What Will the New Year Bring?"	Donna Fargo	1975	Peaked at No. 58 on Billboard's Hot Country Singles chart in 1976.
"Whatever Happened To Christmas?"	Frank Sinatra	1968	Peaked at No. 7 on Billboard's Christmas Singles chart 12/14/1968. Written by Jimmy Webb, and featuring the Don Costa Orchestra. Covered by Aimee Mann in 2006.
"When a Child Is Born"	Michael Holm	1974	Peaked at No. 7 on Billboard's Easy Listening chart and No. 53 on the Billboard Hot 100 singles chart in 1975. Covered in 1976 by Johnny Mathis, whose version spent three weeks at No. 1 on the Official UK Singles Chart in late December 1976 and early 1977. The melody was originally written as "Soleado" in 1972.
"When Winter Comes"	Artie Shaw & his Orchestra	1939	Peaked at No. 6 on the pop singles chart in mid-1939. Featuring vocals by Tony Pastor. From the 1939 film Second Fiddle.
"Where Are You Christmas?"	Faith Hill	2000	Peaked at No. 10 Billboard's Adult Contemporary chart, No. 26 on Billboard's Hot Country Singles & Tracks chart and No. 65 on the Billboard Hot 100 singles chart in 2001. From the 2000 live action film, How the Grinch Stole Christmas. Originally written for and intended to be sung by Mariah Carey, but she was not able due to record label disputes.
"White Christmas"	Bing Crosby	1942	Spent eleven weeks at No. 1 on Billboard's National Best Selling Retail Records chart and three weeks at No. 1 on Billboard's Harlem Hit Parade chart in late 1942. Written by Irving Berlin. Bing Crosby's original 1942 version featured the Ken Darby Singers and John Scott Trotter's Orchestra. The song debuted in the 1942 film Holiday Inn (sung by Crosby), then appeared in the 1954 color film titled after the song. The original was re-recorded in 1947 and it is still the best-selling Christmas single of all time in the U.S. (estimated at more than 50 million sold through the years), and appears on numerous holiday albums as well. Other charting recordings in 1942 were made by Gordon Jenkins (#16), Charlie Spivak (#20) and Freddy Martin (#20). Spivak and Martin recharted in 1945 both peaking at #16. Crosby made #1 again in 1945 and 1947 with his single. Elvis Presley's 1957 cover of the song garnered controversy when Irving Berlin called for his version to be banned from radio airplay.
"White Christmas"	Frank Sinatra	1944	Charted #7 on Billboards popular singles chart.
"White Christmas"	Jo Stafford	1946	Peaked at #9 on Billboard's popular singles chart. Eddy Howard and his Orchestra also charted the title that year peaking at #21.
"White Christmas"	Ernest Tubb	1949	The flip side of his "Blue Christmas" single peaked at No. 7 on Billboard's Country & Western Records chart. A version by The Ravens peaked at No. 9 on Billboard's Rhythm & Blues Records chart in January 1949 on National Records.
"White Christmas"	The Drifters	1954	Peaked at #2 on Billboard's R&B singles chart.
"White Christmas"	Andy Williams	1963	Peaked at #1 on Billboard's Christmas Records chart for 5 weeks.
"White Christmas"	Otis Redding	1968	Peaked at #12 on Billboard's Best Bets For Christmas single chart. The flip side to his popular "Merry Christmas Baby" single.
"White Christmas"	Michael Bublé Duet With Shania Twain	2011	Charted for 26 weeks peaking at #22 in 2015 on Billboard's Holiday 100.
"White Is in the Winter Night"	Enya	2008	Peaked at No. 8 on Billboard's Adult Contemporary chart. Included on Enya's 2008 album, And Winter Came....
"White Winter Hymnal"	Pentatonix	2014	From their album That's Christmas to Me. It charted for 15 weeks peaking at #39 in 2015 on the Holiday 100.
"The White World of Winter"	Bing Crosby	1965	Peaked at No. 20 on the Billboard Christmas Singles chart. Written by Hoagy Carmichael and Mitchell Parish, and recorded with the Sonny Burke Orchestra.
"Who Took the Merry Out of Christmas"	The Staple Singers	1970	Peaked at No. 2 on Billboard's Christmas Singles chart in 1973.
"Why Couldn't It Be Christmas Every Day?"	Bianca Ryan	2006	Though not officially released as a single by Columbia Records, radio stations in several countries played the song in 2006 as part of their Christmas-themed programming.
"Will Santy Come to Shanty Town"	Eddy Arnold, the Tennessee Plowboy and his Guitar	1949	Peaked at No. 5 on Billboard's Country & Western Records Most Played By Folk Disk Jockeys chart. Written by Eddy Arnold, Steve Nelson and his younger brother Ed Nelson, Jr.
"Winter"	Spike Jones and his City Slickers	1952	Peaked at No. 23 on the pop singles chart in early 1953. Featuring the Mello Men on vocals. B-side to Jones's hit recording of "I Saw Mommy Kissing Santa Claus".
"Winter Weather"	Benny Goodman	1941	Peaked at No. 24 on the pop singles chart in 1942. Featuring Peggy Lee and Art Lund on vocals. Also recorded in 1941 by Fats Waller. Later recordings include Jo Stafford (1955) and Tony Bennett (1968).
"Winter Wonderland"	Guy Lombardo and His Royal Canadians	1934	Lombardo's version peaked at No. 2 on the pop singles chart in early 1935, while a version by Ted Weems and his Orchestra peaked at No. 13 on the pop singles chart. Written in 1934 by Felix Bernard (composer) and Richard B. Smith (lyricist). Covered by hundreds of artists. Other charted hit versions include The Andrews Sisters with Guy Lombardo (1946), Pat Green (2003), and Newsboys (2010). Dolly Parton released the medley "Sleigh Ride/Winter Wonderland" that reached #6 on Billboard's Christmas Hits singles chart in 1984. In 2014, Pentatonix released the medley "Winter Wonderland/Don't Worry Be Happy" featuring Tori Kelly from the album That's Christmas to Me that peaked at #31 on the Holiday 100
"Winter Wonderland"	Perry Como and the Satisfiers	1946	Peaked at #10 on Billboard's Popular Music charts.
"Winter Wonderland"	Johnny Mercer and the Pied Pipers	1946	Peaked at #6 on Billboard's Popular Music charts in 1947.
"Winter Wonderland"	Johnny Mathis With Percy Faith & His Orchestra	1958	Featured on his best-selling 1958 album Merry Christmas, the song peaked at #38 on Billboard's Holiday 100 chart in 2012.
"Winter Wonderland"	Ramsey Lewis Trio	1960	Later featured on their 1961 album Sound of Christmas, the single peaked at #23 on Billboard's Best Bets For Christmas in 1966.
"Winter Wonderland"	Darlene Love	1963	From the 1963 holiday album A Christmas Gift for You from Phil Spector. Debuted and peaked at No. 48 on Billboard's main Hot 100 chart (on the week ending January 4, 2025). Also made these other Billboard music charts (with peak positions shown): Global 200 (No. 93), Greatest of All Time Holiday 100 Songs (No. 80), Holiday 100 (No. 31), Holiday Streaming Songs (No. 27), LyricFind Global (No. 15), LyricFind U.S. (No. 20), R&B Streaming Songs (No. 5), R&B/Hip-Hop Streaming Songs (No. 10), and Streaming Songs (No. 33).
"Winter Wonderland"	Air Supply	1987	From Air Supply's The Christmas Album. The song peaked at #11 on Billboard's Holiday Songs chart in 2005.
"Winter Wonderland"	Eurythmics	1987	Featured on the classic various artists album A Very Special Christmas, the song peaked at #11 on Billboard's Holiday Songs chart in 2007.
"Winter Wonderland"	Amy Grant	1992	From her Home for Christmas album, the song peaked at #7 on Billboard's Holiday Songs chart in 2002.
"Winter Wonderland"	Lonestar	2000	Peaked at #24 on Billboard's Holiday Songs chart in 2002.
"Winter World of Love"	Engelbert Humperdinck	1969	Charted on both the Adult Contemporary and Billboard Hot 100 charts in 1969.
"Wistful Willie"	Jimmie Rodgers	1959	Peaked at No. 112 on Billboard's Bubbling Under Hot 100 Singles chart. Featuring the Joe Reisman Orchestra. The flipside, "It's Christmas Once Again" reached the "Beat Of The Week – Singles Coming Up" survey in Music Vendor.
"Wizards in Winter"	Trans-Siberian Orchestra	2004	Peaked at No. 18 on Billboard's Hot Adult Contemporary Tracks chart in 2005. Taken from the group's third holiday album, The Lost Christmas Eve.
"Wonderful Christmastime"	Paul McCartney	1979	Written and produced by McCartney. The single's B-side — "Rudolph the Red-Nosed Reggae" — is an instrumental cover of "Rudolph the Red-Nosed Reindeer." Debuted at No. 87 on Cash Box's Top 100 Singles chart (on the week ending December 29, 1979), peaking at No. 83 two weeks later. Charted for one week on Billboard's Christmas Singles chart at No. 10 (on the week ending December 15, 1984). First entered Billboard's main Hot 100 chart at No. 47 (on the week ending December 29, 2018), peaking at No. 26 (on the week ending January 6, 2024, four weeks following its fourth chart re-entry). Also made these other Billboard music charts (with peak positions shown): Adult Contemporary (No. 29), Adult Pop Airplay (No. 32), Global 200 (No. 15), Global 200 Excl. US (No. 20), Greatest of All Time Holiday 100 Songs (No. 20), Holiday 100 (No. 15), Holiday Airplay (No. 8), Holiday Digital Song Sales (No. 17), Holiday Streaming Songs (No. 13), Hot 100 Recurrents (No. 1), LyricFind Global (No. 18), LyricFind U.S. (No. 12), Radio Songs (No. 48), Rock Digital Song Sales (No. 7), Rock Streaming Songs (No. 2), and Streaming Songs (No. 23).
"The Working Elf Blues"	Daron Norwood	1994	Peaked at No. 75 on Billboard's Hot Country Singles & Tracks chart in early 1995. Parody of Merle Haggard's "Workin' Man Blues".
"Wrapped in Red"	Kelly Clarkson	2013	Peaked at No. 2 on Billboard's Adult Contemporary chart in 2014. First released on Clarkson's 2013 holiday album of the same name.

== Y ==
Title	Artist	Year	Additional information
"Yes, Patricia, There Is a Santa Claus"	Jimmy Dean	1964	Peaked at No. 14 on Billboard's Christmas Singles chart in 1965. Inspired by the famous 1897 newspaper editorial, "Yes, Virginia, there is a Santa Claus". A version by José Ferrer had previously reached the Australian pop chart in 1961.
"Yingle Bells"	Yogi Yorgesson	1949	Peaked at No. 7 on Billboard's Best-Selling Pop Singles chart. Instrumental backing by the Johnny Duffy Trio. Parody of "Jingle Bells".
"You Make It Feel Like Christmas" (1)	Neil Diamond	1984	Peaked at No. 28 on Billboard's Adult Contemporary chart in 1985. Originally appeared on Diamond's 1984 album Primitive, but later re-recorded and included on his 1992 holiday release, The Christmas Album.
"You Make It Feel Like Christmas" (2)	Gwen Stefani featuring Blake Shelton	2017	Debuted and peaked at No. 50 on Billboard's main Hot 100 chart (on the week ending January 4, 2025). Also made these other Billboard music charts (with peak positions shown): Adult Contemporary (No. 9), Bubbling Under Hot 100 (No. 2), Digital Song Sales (No. 16), Global 200 (No. 44), Global 200 Excl. US (No. 56), Greatest of All Time Holiday 100 Songs (No. 83), Holiday 100 (No. 34), Holiday Digital Song Sales (No. 3), Holiday Streaming Songs (No. 29), and Streaming Songs (No. 39).
"You're a Mean One, Mr. Grinch"	Thurl Ravenscroft	1966	From the 1966 Dr. Seuss holiday TV special How the Grinch Stole Christmas! First entered Billboard's main Hot 100 chart at No. 49 on the week ending January 4, 2020, peaking at No. 31 on the week ending December 31, 2022 (upon its fourth chart re-entry). Also made these other Billboard music charts (with peak positions shown): Country Digital Song Sales (No. 8), Digital Song Sales (No. 33), Global 200 (No. 87), Greatest of All Time Holiday 100 Songs (No. 24), Holiday 100 (No. 14), Holiday Airplay (No. 14), Holiday Digital Song Sales (No. 2), Holiday Streaming Songs (No. 8), Hot 100 Recurrents (No. 3), Radio Songs (No. 49), and Streaming Songs (No. 25).
"You're a Mean One, Mr. Grinch"	Whirling Dervishes	1992	Peaked at No. 120 on the Billboard Bubbling Under Hot 100 chart on the week ending January 7, 1995.
"You're All I Want for Christmas" (1)	Frankie Laine	1948	Written by Seger Ellis and Glen T. Moore. Peaked at No. 11 on Billboard's Best-Selling Pop Singles chart in 1948 and No. 15 on Billboard's Race Records chart in 1949. Written by Seger Ellis and Glen Moore. Also charted by Frank Gallagher in 1948. Other versions recorded by Bing Crosby (1949), Eddie Fisher (1952), Al Martino (1964), Jackie Gleason (1967), and the Salsoul Orchestra (1981).
"You're All I Want for Christmas" (2)	Brook Benton	1963	Words and music by Casey Shea and Andy Baldwin. Peaked at No. 3 on Billboard's Christmas Singles chart. Charted again in 1964. Featuring orchestration by Luchi DeJesus. Different song than the same-titled hit by Frankie Laine from 1948. It was recorded in 1964 by Don Patterson for his album Holiday Soul. In 2011 Dutch singer Caro Emerald recorded a version, sampling Benton's original recording to produce a duet.

== Z ==
Title	Artist	Year	Additional information
"'Zat You, Santa Claus?"	Garth Brooks	2002	Peaked at No. 56 on Billboard's Hot Country Singles & Tracks chart in 2003. Written by Jack Fox. Originally recorded by Louis Armstrong with the Commanders in 1953. Another popular version was released by Buster Poindexter in 1987.

== Parodies ==
- Radio personality Bob Rivers wrote dozens of Christmas parodies between 1987 and 2002. Some of the most notable include "The Twelve Pains of Christmas" and "The Restroom Door Said Gentlemen". He has also written some original humorous holiday songs, including "The Chimney Song". These appeared on five albums: Twisted Christmas, I Am Santa Claus, More Twisted Christmas, Chipmunks Roasting on an Open Fire and Christmas.
- Da Yoopers released "Rusty Chevrolet" in 1986, with lyrics written by Jim DeCaire & Joe Potila used with the song "Jingle Bells".
- The comedy duo of Stan Boreson and Doug Setterberg reached No. 10 on the Billboard Christmas charts in 1970 with "Christmas Goose (Snowbird)", a parody of Anne Murray's "Snowbird".
- Homer and Jethro parodied the song "All I Want for Christmas Is My Two Front Teeth" as "All I Want for Christmas Is My Upper Plate", on their 1968 album Cool Crazy Christmas.
- The US TV series South Park aired an early Christmas episode (and namesake song), "Mr. Hankey the Christmas Poo" in 1997. This led to annual Christmas episodes, many including brand new songs or parodies of traditional tunes. An all-music sing-along Christmas 'special' was hosted by Mr. Hankey and a full-length album of the 'new Christmas classics' from the series was released, along with videos for all the songs.
- The political satire group The Capitol Steps has released four Christmas albums: Danny's First Noel (1989), All I Want for Christmas Is a Tax Increase (1993),O, Christmas Bush (2006), and Barackin' Around the Christmas Tree (2009). In addition, some of their other albums contain parodies of Christmas songs. The group's first performance in 1981, was a Christmas show.
- Many Christmas songs were parodied by the Floridian band, The Monsters in the Morning; they were included on the second disc of the Monsters Double Brown album.

== See also ==
- Best-selling Christmas/holiday singles in the United States
- Best-selling Christmas/holiday albums in the United States
- Billboard Christmas Holiday Charts
- Christmas music
- List of Christmas carols
- List of Christmas hit singles in the United Kingdom

== Notes ==
- The Billboard Book of Number 1 Hits by Fred Bronson
- Billboard's Book of Top 40 Hits: 1955–2003 by Joel Whitburn
- Billboard's Top Pop Singles 1955–2002 by Joel Whitburn
- Hit Singles: Top 20 Charts from 1954 to the Present Day by Dave McAleer
- Christmas in the Charts 1920–2004 by Joel Whitburn. Record Research Inc. (2004) ISBN 0-89820-161-6

== Bibliography ==
- Whitburn, Joel (2004). Christmas in the Charts (1920–2004). Wisconsin: Record Research Inc. ISBN 0-89820-161-6.
