= Our Man in New Orleans =

Studio album by Al Hirt
- Released: 1963
- Studio: RCA (Hollywood, California)
- Genre: Jazz
- Label: RCA Victor
- Producer: Steve Sholes

Al Hirt chronology
Honey in the Horn (1963)	Our Man in New Orleans (1963)	Beauty and the Beard (1964)

Our Man in New Orleans is an album by Al Hirt (RCA-LPM-2607) released by RCA Victor. The album was conducted and arranged by Marty Paich and produced by Steve Sholes.

The album landed on the Billboard Top LPs chart in 1963, reaching No. 44.

== Track listing ==
1. "Clarinet Marmalade" (Henry Ragas, Larry Shields)
2. "Ol' Man River" (Jerome Kern, Oscar Hammerstein II)
3. "New Orleans" (Hoagy Carmichael)
4. "Panama" (William H. Tyers)
5. "The Birth of the Blues" (Ray Henderson, Buddy G. DeSylva, Lew Brown)
6. "Ja-Da" (Bob Carleton)
7. "Wolverine Blues" (Jelly Roll Morton, Benjamin Franklin Spikes, John Spikes)
8. "Oh Dem Golden Slippers" (James A. Bland)
9. "When the Saints Go Marching In"
10. "When It's Sleepy Time Down South" (Clarence Muse, Leon René, Otis René)
11. "Muskrat Ramble" (Edward "Kid" Ory)
12. "Dear Old Southland" (Turner Layton, Henry Creamer)

== Chart positions ==
Chart (1963)	Peak position
Billboard Top LPs	44
