= Swingin' Down Yonder =

Studio album by Dean Martin
- Released: August 1, 1955
- Recorded: September 30, 1954, October 7, 1954, and February 4, 1955, Capitol Recording Studio, 5515 Melrose Avenue, Hollywood, California
- Genres: Vocal jazz, Dixieland
- Length: 33:34
- Label: Capitol Capitol T-576
- Producers: Lee Gillette, Voyle Gilmore

Dean Martin chronology
Dean Martin Sings (1953)	Swingin' Down Yonder (1955)	Pretty Baby (1957)

Swingin' Down Yonder is the second studio album by Dean Martin for Capitol Records during three sessions in September and October 1954 and February 1955. According to the original sleeve notes, all the songs have a "common geographical root: the American South." In 1963, Capitol Records re-released Swingin' Down Yonder under the titled Southern Style.

The 1991 Capitol Records CD reissue added eight bonus tracks which for the most part uphold the Dixieland sound. By contrast, the 2005 Collectors' Choice reissue selected four bonus tracks of dubious connection to the American South, including "Under the Bridges of Paris".

Professional ratings
Review scores
Source	Rating
Allmusic	link

== Track listing ==
=== LP ===
Capitol T-576

==== Side A ====
Track	Song title	Written by	Recording date	Session information	Time
1.	"Carolina Moon"	Benny Davis and Joe Burke	September 30, 1954	Session 3538; Master 13029-6	2:35
2.	"Waiting for the Robert E. Lee"	Lewis F. Muir and L. Wolfe Gilbert	October 7, 1954	Session 3544; Master 13056	2:19
3.	"When It's Sleepy Time Down South"	Leon René, Otis Rene, Clarence Muse	September 30, 1954	Session 3538; Master 12717	2:52
4.	"Mississippi Mud"	Harry Barris and James M. Cavanaugh	September 30, 1954	Session 3538; Master 12705	3:08
5.	"Alabamy Bound"	Ray Henderson, B.G. DeSylva and Bud Green	February 4, 1955	Session 3690; Master 13551	1:45
6.	"Dinah"	Harry Akst, Sam M. Lewis and Joe Young	February 4, 1955	Session 3690; Master 13550-6	2:21

==== Side B ====
Track	Song title	Written by	Recording date	Session information	Time
1.	"Carolina in the Morning"	Walter Donaldson and Gus Kahn	October 7, 1954	Session 3544; Master 135073-3	2:17
2.	"Way Down Yonder in New Orleans"	Henry Creamer and J. Turner Layton	September 30, 1954	Session 3538; Master 13030	2:21
3.	"Georgia on My Mind"	Hoagy Carmichael and Stuart Gorrell	October 7, 1954	Session 3544; Master 13051-6	3:03
4.	"Just a Little Bit South of North Carolina"	Sunny Skylar, Bette Cannon and Arthur Shaftel	October 7, 1954	Session 3544; Master 13050	2:07
5.	"Basin Street Blues"	Spencer Williams	February 4, 1955	Session 3690; Master 13548	2:23
6.	"Is It True What They Say About Dixie?"	Irving Caesar, Sammy Lerner and Gerald Marks	February 4, 1955	Session 3690; Master 13549-4	2:29

=== 7" EP Set (Same credits as LP) ===
Capitol F1-576

==== Side A ====
Track	Song Title
1.	"Carolina Moon"
2.	"Waiting for the Robert E. Lee"

==== Side B ====
Track	Song Title
1.	"Basin Street Blues"
2.	"Is It True What They Say About Dixie?"

Capitol F2-576

==== Side A ====
Track	Song Title
1.	"When It's Sleepy Time Down South"
2.	"Mississippi Mud"

==== Side B ====
Track	Song Title
1.	"Georgia On My Mind"
2.	"Just a Little Bit South of North Carolina"

Capitol F3-576

==== Side A ====
Track	Song Title
1.	"Alabamy Bound"
2.	"Dinah"

==== Side B ====
Track	Song Title
1.	"Carolina in the Morning"
2.	"Way Down Yonder in New Orleans"

=== Compact Disc ===
==== 1991 Capitol CD, Catalog Number CDP 7 94306 2 (original album plus eight more tracks) ====
Track	Song title	Written by	Recording date	Session information	Time
1.	"Hominy Grits"	Smiley Burnette	July 2, 1952	Session 2695; Master 10354-2	3:02
2.	"I'm Gonna' Paper All My Walls with Your Love Letters"	Teddie Powell and Bernie Wayne	March 3, 1950	Session 1646; Master 5606-2	3:31
3.	"Muskrat Ramble"	Edward Ory and Ray Gilbert	March 3, 1950	Session 1646; Master 5607-6	3:05
4.	"Be Honest with Me"	Gene Autry and Fred Rose	March 28, 1950	Session 1693; Master 5800-3	2:40
5.	"I Don't Care if the Sun Don't Shine"	Mack David	March 28, 1950	Session 1693; Master 5662-2	1:56
6.	"Bye Bye Blackbird"	Ray Henderson and Mort Dixon	April 27, 1950	Session 1725; Master 5919-2	3:05
7.	"Happy Feet"	Roy Ross and Al Stillman	April 27, 1950	Session 1725; 5920-6	2:32
8.	"The Darktown Strutter's Ball"	Shelton Brooks	April 28, 1950	Session 1726; Master 5925-3	2:32

==== 2005 Collectors' Choice Music CD, Catalog Number WWCCM05992 (original album plus four more tracks) ====
Track	Song title	Written by	Recording date	Session information	Time
1.	"I'll Gladly Make the Same Mistake Again"	Sammy Cahn and David Holt	August 12, 1954	Session 3497; Master 12911-5	2:34
2.	"Three Wishes"	Jack Elliott and Harold Spina	March 9, 1949	Session 1221A; Master 4090-2	2:38
3.	"Have a Little Sympathy"	Ben Weisman and Sammy Gallop	January 26, 1949	Session 1172A; Master 3906-2	2:22
4.	"Under the Bridges of Paris"	Vincent Scotto, Jean Rodor and Dorcas Cochran	April 22, 1954	Session 3402; Master 12573	2:45

== Personnel ==
- Dean Martin: Vocals
- Dick Stabile: Leader
- Vincent Terri: Guitar
- Phil Stephens: Bass
- Ray S. Toland: Drums/Contractor
- Louis Brown: Piano
- Gus Bivona: Saxophone (Sessions 3538 and 3544)
- Charles O. Butler: Saxophone (Session 3690)
- Edward R. Miller: Saxophone (Sessions 3538 and 3544)
- Edward 'Ed' Rosa: Saxophone (Session 3690)
- Milton Bernhardt: Trombone (Session 3690)
- Francis L. 'Joe' Howard: Trombone
- Thomas 'Tom' Pederson: Trombone (Sessions 3538 and 3544)
- George M. Roberts: Trombone (Session 3544 and 3690)
- Lloyd Ulyate: Trombone
- Virgil P. Evans: Trumpet
- Conrad Gozzo: Trumpet (Session 3690)
- Emanuel 'Mannie' Klein: Trumpet (Sessions 3538 and 3544)
- Charles E. Teagarden: Trumpet
