= 23 Standards (Quartet) 2003 =

Live album by Anthony Braxton
- Released: June 2004
- Recorded: February 19 to November 20, 2003 in Europe
- Genre: Jazz
- Length: 270:55
- Label: Leo LR 402/405
- Producer: Anthony Braxton and Leo Feigin

Anthony Braxton chronology
Saturn, Conjunct the Grand Canyon in a Sweet Embrace (2003)	23 Standards (Quartet) 2003 (2004)	20 Standards (Quartet) 2003 (2003)

23 Standards (Quartet) 2003 is a live album 4CD box set by American composer and saxophonist Anthony Braxton recorded in Europe in 2003 and released on the Leo label in 2004

== Reception ==
Professional ratings
Review scores
Source	Rating
The Guardian	4/5 stars
The Penguin Guide to Jazz Recordings	3/4 stars

The Guardian's review by John Fordham states:

Braxton sometimes plays within the harmony or close to the melody and original shape, but the usually sultry "Black Orpheus" is delivered as if Braxton's soprano were an out-of-tune violin, and Desafinado as a textural exploration of suckings, crackles and barking effects from guitarist Kevin O'Neill. Some celebrated themes, like Joe Henderson's "Recorda Me", Braxton elects to play at the highest altitude he can reach, so the usual sensuous bossa murmur becomes an eerie, hesitant sound, like a nervous child trying to come downstairs in the dark. But the biggest star on this set is the whole quartet.

— Fordham, J. (August 6, 2004). "The Guardian Review".

All About Jazz reviewer Rex Butters felt:

This is crucial listening for anyone who cares about this catalogue of songs, Braxton shoulders open a doorway to a viable jazz future. Rather than presenting an airless mummified Sunday afternoon at the Jazz Museum, the band's ability to dance with history and buy it a drink resembles the time traveling sensibilities of Mingus and Kirk.

— Butters, R. (January 26, 2005). "All About Jazz Review".

== Track listing ==
Disc One:

1. "Crazy Rhythm" (Irving Caesar, Joseph Meyer, Roger Wolfe Kahn) - 16:50
2. "Off Minor" (Thelonious Monk) - 11:36
3. "Desafinado" (Antônio Carlos Jobim, Newton Mendonça) - 4:35
4. "26-1" (John Coltrane) - 11:15
5. "Why Shouldn't I" (Cole Porter) - 10:42
6. "Giant Steps" (Coltrane) - 12:32

Disc Two:

1. "Tangerine" (Victor Schertzinger, Johnny Mercer) - 14:35
2. "Black Orpheus" (Luiz Bonfá, Antônio Maria) - 13:53
3. "Round Midnight" (Monk) - 13:03
4. "Ju—Ju" (Wayne Shorter) - 10:26
5. "After You've Gone" (Turner Layton, Henry Creamer) - 17:16

Disc Three:

1. "Everything I Love" (Porter) - 12:24
2. "I Can't Get Started" (Vernon Duke, Ira Gershwin) - 11:09
3. "It's a Raggy Waltz" (Dave Brubeck) - 10:12
4. "Countdown" (Coltrane) - 12:08
5. "Blue in Green" (Bill Evans) - 5:11
6. "Beatrice" (Sam Rivers) - 9:27

Disc Four:

1. "Only The Lonely" (Sammy Cahn, Jimmy Van Heusen) - 6:37
2. "Recorda Me" (Joe Henderson) - 15:52
3. "Ill Wind" (Harold Arlen, Ted Koehler) - 17:00
4. "I'll Be Easy to Find" (Bart Howard) - 11:29
5. "Three to Get Ready" (Brubeck) - 10:29
6. "Dolphin Dance" (Herbie Hancock) - 10:47
- Recorded on February 19 at De Singel in Antwerp, Belgium (Disc Three: track 5 and Disc Four: track 2), on February 22 at Flagey in Brussels, Belgium (Disc One: tracks 5 & 6), on November 15 at the Bimhuis in Amsterdam, the Netherlands (Disc Two: tracks 1–4 & Disc Three: tracks 1–4), on November 17 at Teatro Filarmonico in Verona, Italy (Disc Three: track 6), on November 18 at the Roma Jazz Festival in, Rome, Italy (Disc One: tracks 1–4), on November 19 at Culturgest in Lisbon, Portugal (Disc Four: tracks 3–5), and on November 20 at Auditorio da Universidade de Minho in Guimaraes, Portugal (Disc Two: track 5 and Disc Four: tracks 1 & 6)

== Personnel ==
- Anthony Braxton - reeds
- Kevin O'Neil - guitar
- Andy Eulau - bass
- Kevin Norton - percussion

== Sources ==
- Butters, R. (January 26, 2005). "All About Jazz Review".
