= Alabamy Bound =

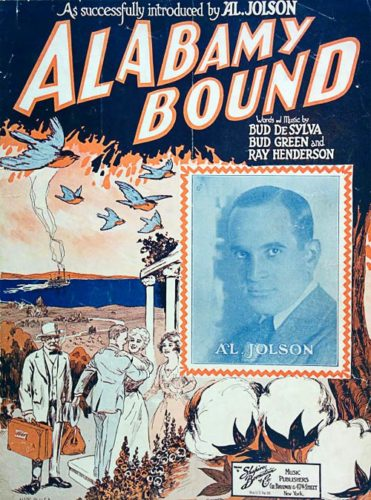
- Sheet music cover featuring Al Jolson, 1924

Song
- Published: 1924
- Released: 1925
- Genre: Popular music
- Composer: Ray Henderson
- Lyricists: Buddy DeSylva, Bud Green

"Alabamy Bound" is a Tin Pan Alley tune written in 1924, with music by Ray Henderson and words by Buddy DeSylva and Bud Green. It was popularized by Al Jolson and included in the musical Kid Boots, where it was sung by Eddie Cantor. Successful recordings of the song were released in 1925 by Paul Whiteman, Isham Jones and Fletcher Henderson (instrumentals), as well as Blossom Seeley, whose vocal version reached number 2 on the charts. The song has sold over a million copies of sheet music and has been included in several films over the years.

== Song history ==
"Alabamy Bound" was the first collaboration between lyricist Buddy DeSylva and composer Ray Henderson, a partnership that would last until 1930 (with lyricist Lew Brown instead of Bud Green). DeSylva gave the song to singer Al Jolson, who liked it and began performing it on every occasion, including special appearances, nightclubs and restaurants. The song became associated with him and a hit before it was even recorded. Sheet music sales exceeded one million.

Given the popularity of the song, it was interpolated into the Broadway show Kid Boots, featuring Eddie Cantor, which reportedly prevented the show from closing for some time. The earliest recording of the song was made on December 29, 1924, by the Paul Whiteman Orchestra, which was released as a phonograph record in 1925. That year, Blossom Seeley had a #2 hit with her recording, and Isham Jones & His Orchestra made a popular rendition as well. The version recorded by Fletcher Henderson & His Orchestra is noted for its clarinet trio arranged by Don Redman.

In 1941, the song was revived when it was included in The Great American Broadcast, sung by The Ink Spots. In 1954, the song re-entered the charts with a rendition by The Mulcays.

== Themes ==
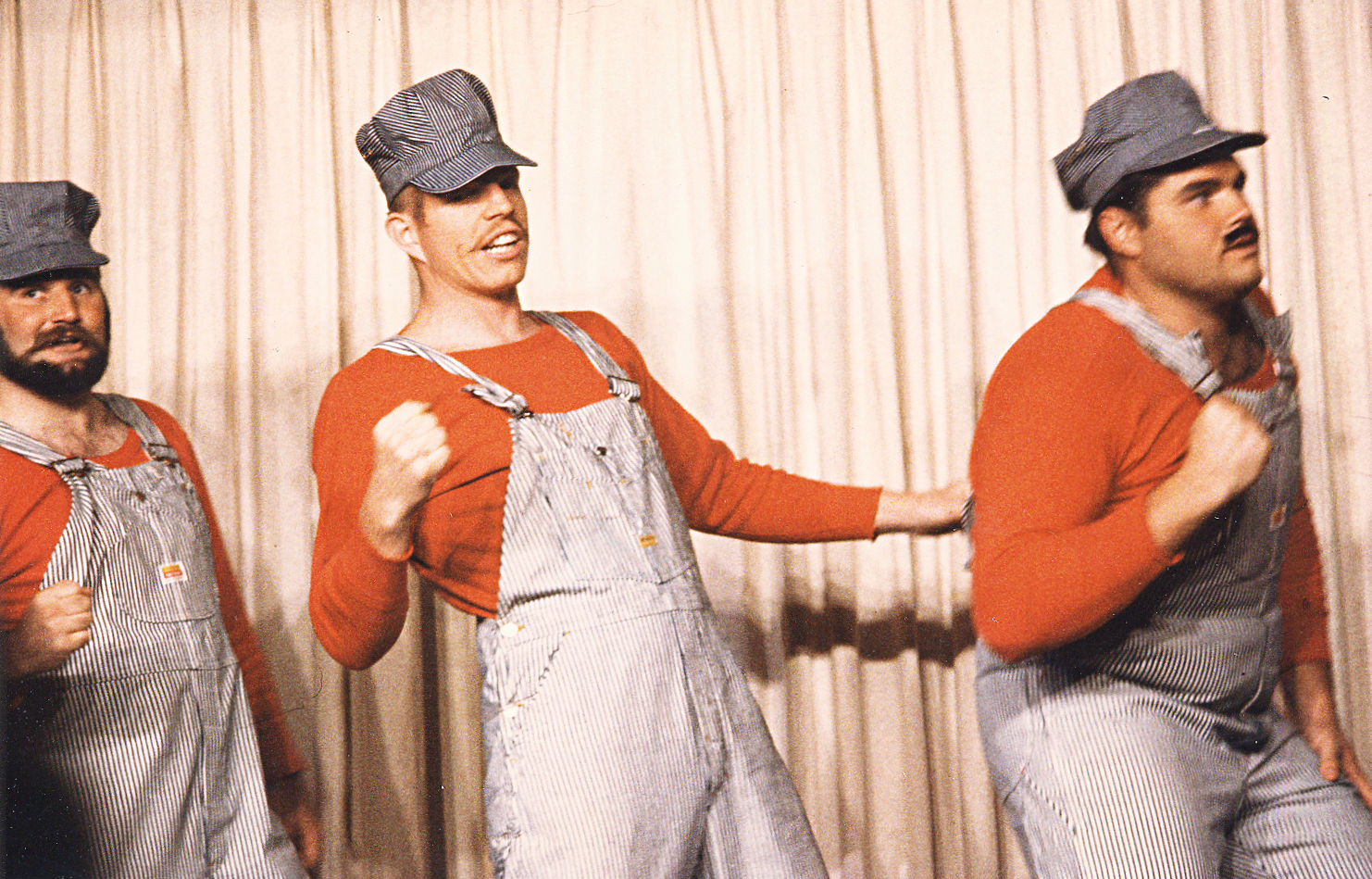
"Alabamy Bound" was one of many 'olio' song and dance numbers of the 1920s. Here depicted is a performance from the early 1960s.

"Alabamy Bound" has been described as a "bright march-type ditty" with a "southern flavor". The lyrics are written from the point of view of an Alabamian who is returning home, presumably from working in a larger city like New York or Chicago. Ray Henderson's melody and its "driving-train-like rhythm" provides a setting for the scene of this train song. Implicit in the song is the notion of trains as the fastest, safest and most comfortable means of transport at the time, which adds to the positive image of the character returning home. Its reference to the Southern United States was a common thread in many of Jolson's songs, such as "Rock-a-Bye Your Baby with a Dixie Melody" and "Carolina in the Morning".

== List of recordings ==
Early recordings

Date	Artist	Label
1924	Paul Whiteman and His Orchestra	Victor 19557-A
1925	Isham Jones & His Orchestra	Brunswick 2789B
1925	Blossom Seeley	Columbia 304D
1925	Bailey's Lucky Seven	Gennett 5648A
1925	Sara Martin	OKeh 8262A
1925	Fletcher Henderson and His Orchestra	Regal 9789-A (also for Domino, Banner, and Ajax)
1925	Layton & Johnstone	Columbia 3672

Other notable recordings

- The Mulcays (1954) - They were a harmonica duo and they charted briefly with the song reaching the No. 24 spot in 1954.
- Dean Martin (1955) - included in the album Swingin' Down Yonder
- Roberta Sherwood (1956) - included in the album Clap Your Hands
- Bing Crosby (1957) - included in the album New Tricks. Crosby also recorded the song for the 1975 album A Southern Memoir
- Ray Charles (1960) - included in the album The Genius Hits the Road (1960)
- Michael Holliday (1961) - included in the album Happy Holliday
- Bobby Darin (1962) - included in the album Oh! Look at Me Now

Film appearances

- King of Burlesque (1935) when it was sung by the chorus girls.
- The Great American Broadcast (1941) - sung by The Ink Spots
- Babes on Broadway (1941) - Eddie Peabody on banjo, dubbing for Mickey Rooney
- Broadway (1942)
- Show Business (1944) - sung a cappella by Eddie Cantor. Performed later by Eddie Cantor, George Murphy, Constance Moore and Joan Davis.
- With a Song in My Heart (1952) - performed by Susan Hayward (dubbed by Jane Froman) as part of a medley
- The Purple Rose of Cairo (1985) - sung by Jeff Daniels

Television appearances

- The Muppet Show (1979) - sung by a boatload of Muppet penguins dressed as Pilgrims.

Videogame appearances

- Looney Tunes World of Mayhem as part of the Wackynvasion Season.
