= A Southern Memoir =

Studio album by Bing Crosby
- Released: December 1975
- Recorded: January 16, 21, 1975
- Genre: Vocal
- Label: London Records (SHU 8489)
- Producer: Bing Crosby

Bing Crosby chronology
I’ll Sing You a Song of the Islands (Coral Records CPS 90) (1972)	A Southern Memoir (1975)	That's What Life Is All About (1975)

Professional ratings
Review scores
Source	Rating
Allmusic	3/5 stars

A Southern Memoir is the thirty-eighth solo studio album by American singer and actor Bing Crosby at his own expense at TTG Studios, Los Angeles, California in January 1975. He was accompanied by Paul Smith and his Orchestra. Crosby leased the tracks to the English branch of Decca following negotiations with producer Geoff Milne and the album was issued on Decca's London label.

The album was issued on CD by Collectors' Choice Music (CCM 2160) in 2010 having been remixed from the original eight track master tapes by Robert S. Bader of Bing Crosby Enterprises. Seven bonus tracks were included in the CD.

== Background ==
In January 1974, Crosby was seriously ill and after two weeks of tests, he underwent three and a half hours of major surgery. Two-fifths of his left lung and an abscess the size of a small orange were removed. The tumor was a rare fungus called nocardia. There were concerns that he would not be able to sing again and his recuperation took many months. He eventually did some television work and then decided to return to the recording studio.

== Reception ==
The UK magazine The Gramophone reviewed the album saying: "Crosby can be sampled on his own to pleasant effect in “A Southern Memoir” which in conformity with its title is a relaxed, easy-going selection of numbers from below the Mason–Dixon line..."

Record producer, Ken Barnes, wrote: "This collection of “Southern-cum-mammy” type songs was a pet project of Bing’s and his affection for the material reveals itself time and again throughout each of the twelve songs. The small-band backings arranged by pianist-conductor Paul Smith are beautifully written and very well played. Bing sings with greater spirit and drive than on his album with Basie and some of the tracks, notably “Carolina in the Morning,” “Swanee,” and “Sailing Down the Chesapeake Bay” stand comparison with some of his best-ever up-tempo performances."

== Personnel ==
Paul Smith (piano, conductor); Frank Capp (drums); Tony Rizzi (guitar, January 16 session); Allen Reuss (guitar, January 21 session); Joe Valenti (trumpet); Monty Budwig (bass); Dick Nash (trombone); Larry Bunker (percussion, January 16 session); Vic Feldman (percussion, January 21 session); Dominic Mumolo (saxophone); Don Raffell (saxophone), Johnny Rotella (saxophone).

== Track listing ==
Side one
No.	Title	Writer(s)	Length
1.	"On the Alamo"	Isham Jones, Gus Kahn	3:23
2.	"Alabamy Bound"	Ray Henderson, Bud Green, Buddy DeSylva	2:14
3.	"Where the Morning Glories Grow"	Richard Whiting, Gus Kahn, Raymond B. Egan	2:15
4.	"Stars Fell on Alabama"	Frank Perkins, Mitchell Parish	3:03
5.	"Carolina in the Morning"	Walter Donaldson, Gus Kahn	3:07
6.	"Swanee"	George Gershwin, Irving Caesar	2:15

Side two
No.	Title	Writer(s)	Length
7.	"Way Down Yonder in New Orleans"	Henry Creamer, Turner Layton	2:23
8.	"Georgia on My Mind"	Hoagy Carmichael, Stuart Gorrell	2:48
9.	"Cryin' for the Carolines"	Harry Warren, Joe Young, Sam M. Lewis	3:24
10.	"She Is the Sunshine of Virginia"	Harry Carroll, Ballard MacDonald	2:23
11.	"When It's Sleepy Time Down South"	Leon René, Otis René, Clarence Muse	2:48
12.	"Sailing Down the Chesapeake Bay"	George Botsford, Jean C. Havez	2:24

Bonus Tracks on Collectors' Choice CD
No.	Title	Writer(s)	Length
13.	"Bing's South Texas Quail Hunting Medley"		5:28
14.	"On the Alamo" (alternate)	Isham Jones, Gus Kahn	3:59
15.	"Alabamy Bound" (alternate)	Ray Henderson, Bud Green, Buddy DeSylva	2:25
16.	"Stars Fell on Alabama" (alternate)	Frank Perkins, Mitchell Parish
17.	"Swanee" (alternate)	George Gershwin, Irving Caesar	2:25
18.	"Georgia on My Mind" (original LP edit)	Hoagy Carmichael, Stuart Gorrell	2:47
19.	"When It's Sleepy Time Down South" (alternate)	Leon René, Otis René, Clarence Muse	3:02
