= For Alto =

Studio album by Anthony Braxton
- Released: 1971
- Recorded: 1969
- Genres: Avant-garde jazz; free jazz
- Length: 72:58
- Label: Delmark

Anthony Braxton chronology
Three Compositions of New Jazz (1968)	For Alto (1971)	Silence (1969)

For Alto is a studio album by American composer and saxophonist Anthony Braxton, recorded in 1969 and released on Delmark Records in 1971. Braxton performs the pieces on this album entirely on alto saxophone, with no additional musicians or overdubbing. Although other jazz musicians, such as Coleman Hawkins, Sonny Rollins, and Eric Dolphy, had recorded unaccompanied saxophone solos, For Alto was the first jazz album composed solely of solo saxophone music.

== Background ==
According to Braxton, For Alto came about as a result of his fascination with the solo piano music of Arnold Schoenberg, Fats Waller, and Karlheinz Stockhausen. However, feeling that his skills on the piano were inadequate, he decided to create "a particular language for the saxophone." He also cited the experience of a 1967 improvised solo saxophone concert during which he ran out of ideas. He recalled: "I imagined I was just going to get up there and play for one hour from pure invention, but after ten minutes I'd run through all my ideas and started to repeat myself. I felt like, 'Oh my God, and there's still fifty minutes to go!'" This led to a project in which he catalogued specific, easily identifiable musical elements (for example, long sounds, trills, multiphonics, short attacks) which could then be used as "starting points or springboards to musical activity." Braxton would term this concept "Language Music," of which For Alto is an early example.

Braxton later stated that he recorded the music himself in the basement of the Parkway Community Center in Chicago, and that he "basically gave it to Delmark Records." Although the published liner notes consist only of a series of diagrams, he had originally intended to include a lengthy essay in which he stated: "If this record doesn't sell a million copies I will be very disappointed. Already I am making room on my mantle for a gold record and I am going to have parties and I am preparing an acceptance speech." Braxton would go on to record several more solo alto saxophone albums, such as Saxophone Improvisations Series F (1972) and Alto Saxophone Improvisations 1979, and For Alto would inspire other saxophonists, such as Joe McPhee, Evan Parker, and Steve Lacy, to record their own solo albums.

== Reception ==
Professional ratings
Review scores
Source	Rating
AllMusic	4.5/5 stars
DownBeat	5/5 stars
The Encyclopedia of Popular Music	4/5 stars
MusicHound Jazz	3.5/5 stars
The Penguin Guide to Jazz	👑
The Rolling Stone Jazz Record Guide	4/5 stars
Sputnikmusic	3.5/5 stars

Initial reaction to the album was mixed. In a June 1971 DownBeat review, Joe H. Klee called the album "revolutionary" and awarded it five stars. In the same issue of DownBeat, saxophonist Harold Land commented on the track "To Artist Murry DePillars" for the magazine's "Blindfold Test" column: "I think that he's a very good saxophonist... I have great respect for his technique and his control of the instrument." Four months later, the magazine published a second Blindfold Test, this time with saxophonist Phil Woods, in which he stated of the same track: "That was terrible, I can't imagine the ego of a person thinking they can sustain a whole performance by themselves... It's not jazzy, it's not classical... it's dull... this is such an ego trip..."

Subsequent reactions have been more uniformly positive, and the album is now recognized as a landmark. The AllMusic review by Thom Jurek stated: "For Alto is one of the greatest solo saxophone records ever made, and maybe one of the greatest recordings ever issued, period". The Penguin Guide to Jazz gives For Alto a four-star rating (of a possible four) along with its "crown" token of merit, and describes it as "one of the genuinely important American recordings. While some landmark performances retain only a mystical aura of their original significance, [For Alto] remains powerfully listenable and endlessly fascinating."

In All About Jazz, Derek Taylor observed: "This is a recording and artistic statement that completely changed the rules. Braxton's gall seemed audacious to some, but revolutionary to far more and the hindsight of history has proven this latter camp correct." In Jazzwise, Kevin Le Gendre stated: "Braxton's alto saxophone is like the sound of acid dripped from the beating wings of hummingbirds, a charmingly corrosive caress. Through brilliant dynamics, lyricism, harmonic invention and pure sound trickery, Braxton showed a single horn could be a complete orchestra." Nate Wooley, writing for Sound American, interpreted For Alto as "a fascinating document" of Braxton’s concept of language types, as well as "an enjoyably rigorous example of his mastery of the alto saxophone."

Author Tom Moon included the album in his book 1,000 Recordings to Hear Before You Die, writing: "For Alto is dizzying and maddening, dense and challenging, inventive and offputting. It's also among a handful of great solo saxophone recordings in jazz, alongside the unaccompanied tunes on Eric Dolphy's Far Cry."

== Track listing ==
All tracks are written by Anthony Braxton.

Side one
No.	Title	Length
1.	"Dedicated to Multi-Instrumentalist Jack Gell"	0:42
2.	"To Composer John Cage"	9:30
3.	"To Artist Murry DePillars"	4:17
4.	"To Pianist Cecil Taylor"	5:18
Total length:		19:47

Side two
No.	Title	Length
1.	"Dedicated to Ann and Peter Allen"	12:54
Total length:		12:54

Side three
No.	Title	Length
1.	"Dedicated to Susan Axelrod"	10:24
2.	"To My Friend Kenny McKenny"	10:06
Total length:		20:30

Side four
No.	Title	Length
1.	"Dedicated to Multi-Instrumentalist Leroy Jenkins"	19:47
Total length:		19:47

== Personnel ==
- Anthony Braxton – alto saxophone
