= Deep River (song) =

Anonymous spiritual song of African-American origin

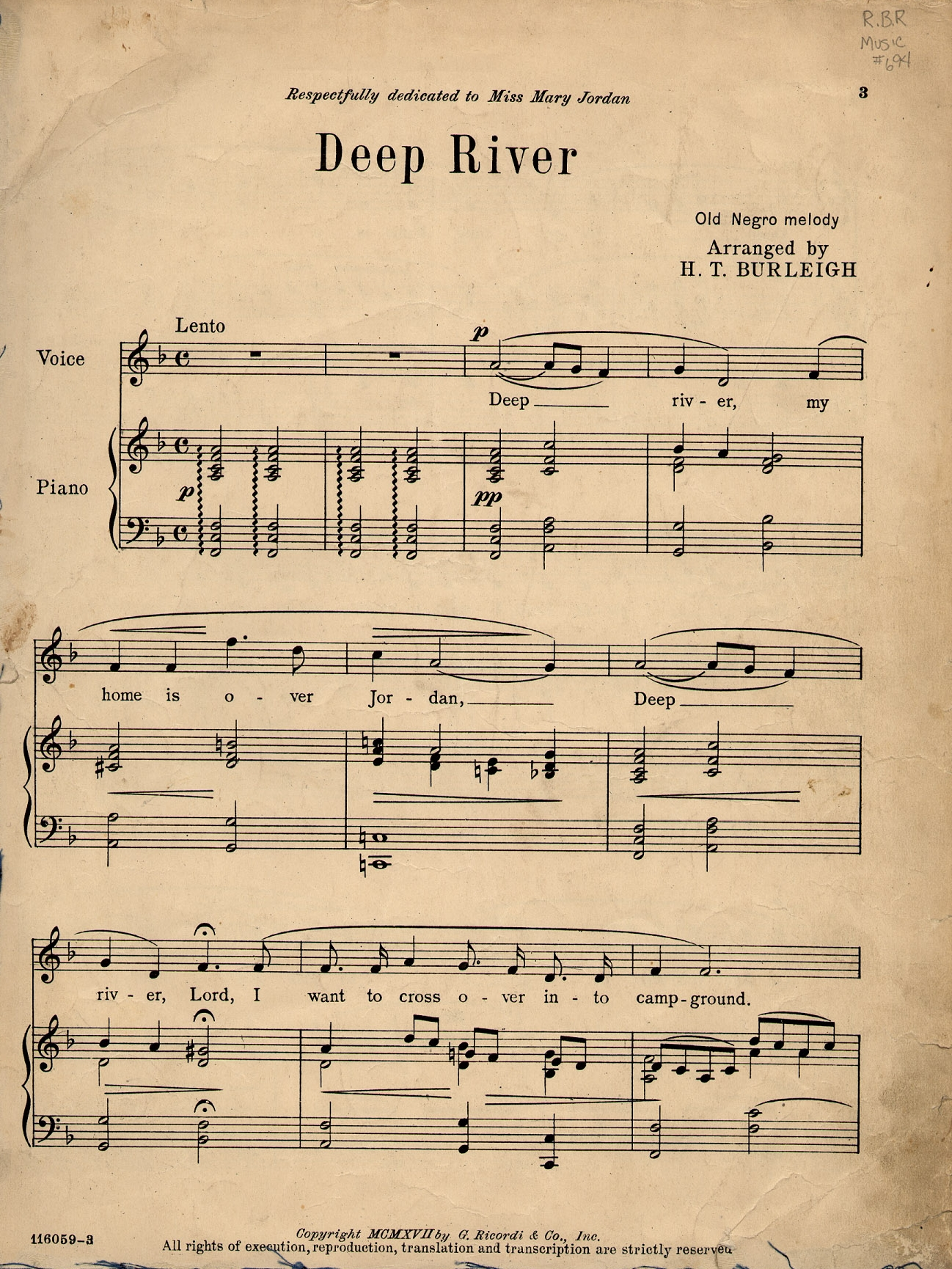
Sheet music for Henry T. Burleigh's influential 1917 arrangement of "Deep River"

"Deep River" is an anonymous African-American spiritual, popularized by Henry Burleigh in his 1916 collection Jubilee Songs of the USA.

== Overview ==
The song was first mentioned in print in 1876, when it was published in the first edition of The Story of the Jubilee Singers: With Their Songs, by J. B. T. Marsh. By 1917, when Harry Burleigh completed the last of his several influential arrangements, the song had become very popular in recitals. It has been called "perhaps the best known and best-loved spiritual".

== Adaptations ==
The melody was adopted in 1921 for the song Dear Old Southland by Henry Creamer and Turner Layton, which enjoyed popular success the next year in versions by Paul Whiteman and by Vernon Dalhart.

Samuel Coleridge-Taylor arranged the melody in the tenth of his 24 Negro Melodies Op. 59 (1905).

Daniel Gregory Mason quotes the melody in his String Quartet on Negro Themes Op. 19 (1919).

"Deep River" has been sung in several films. The 1929 film Show Boat featured it mouthed by Laura La Plante to the singing of Eva Olivetti. Paul Robeson famously sang it accompanied by a male chorus in the 1940 movie The Proud Valley, and Chevy Chase sang it in the 1983 blockbuster hit National Lampoon's Vacation.

"Deep River" is also one of five spirituals written into the 1941 oratorio A Child of Our Time by Michael Tippett.

== Recordings ==
- Marian Anderson recorded a version in November 1923 for the Victor label (catalog No. 19227).
- Paul Robeson recorded the song on May 10, 1927, for the Montgomery Ward label (catalog No. 6054).
- Tommy Dorsey recorded a version on February 17, 1941, for the Victor label (catalog No. 36396B).
- Deep River Boys featuring Harry Douglas with Pete Brown's Orchestra recorded the song in Oslo on August 23, 1956, and released it on the 78 rpm record by His Master's Voice AL 6039).
- Odetta recorded a version for her 1957 album At the Gate of Horn.
- Johnny Mathis's third album, Good Night, Dear Lord, released 1958.
- The Roger Wagner Chorale recorded Roger Wagner's arrangement, first released on the album The Negro Spiritual for Capitol Records (SP 8600) in 1964.
- Mahalia Jackson recorded a version for her 1964 album, Let's Pray Together on the Columbia Records label.
- St. Jacob's Chamber Choir and Anders Paulsson recorded a version on the choir's 1997 album, Spirituals (BIS Records AB)
- Bobby Womack recorded the song for the 2012 album The Bravest Man in the Universe
- Beverly Glenn-Copeland included a live recording of the song on his 2020 album Transmissions.
