= Way Down Yonder in New Orleans =

1922 popular song

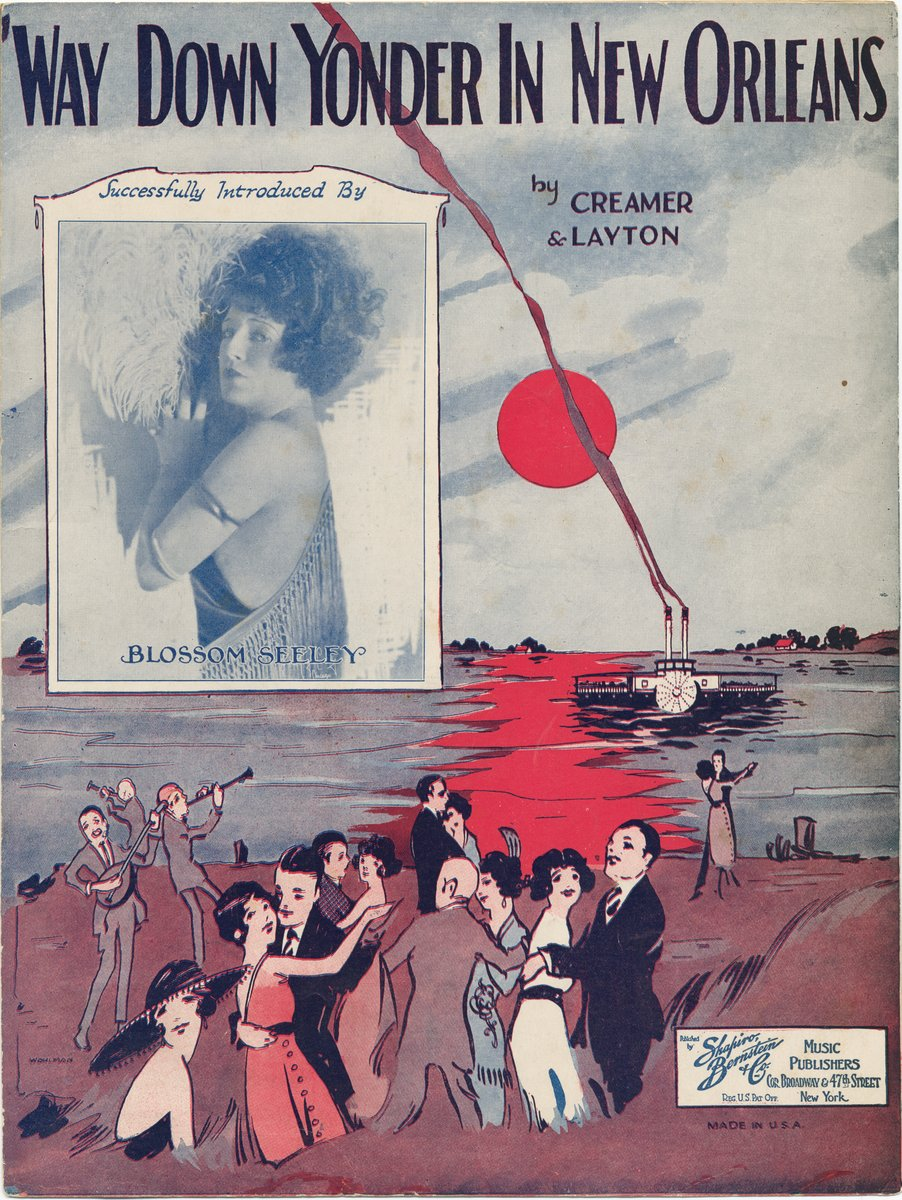
- 1922 sheet music cover with a photo of singer Blossom Seeley

Song
- Published: 1922
- Songwriters: Joe Turner Layton, Henry Creamer

Audio sample
- Recording of Way Down Yonder in New Orleans, performed by The Georgians (1922): file; help

"Way Down Yonder in New Orleans" is a popular song with music by Turner Layton and lyrics by Henry Creamer. First published in 1922, it was advertised by Creamer and Layton as "A Southern Song, without A Mammy, A Mule, Or A Moon", a dig at some of the Tin Pan Alley clichés of the era.

It was performed at The Winter Garden Theater in New York in Act 2 of the Broadway musical production Spice of 1922. The original 1922 sheet music featured a drawing of a girl on a spice bottle on the front cover, referring to the musical in which the song eventually made its public debut.

Early successful recordings of the song were by the Peerless Quartet, Blossom Seeley and Paul Whiteman.

The song has been recorded numerous times from the early 1920s into the 21st century. Layton himself recorded the song as part of the duo Layton & Johnstone in 1927. Roger Wolfe Kahn and His Orchestra played the song in their 1932 film short The Yacht Party. Notable uses have included being the theme song for the radio program This Is Jazz in the 1940s.

According to Dick Biondi, Freddy Cannon's 1959 version became the first record in the rock era to have a full brass section. It reached number 3 on the Billboard, Canadian CHUM Chart, and UK charts in early 1960. The song was performed by Harry Connick Jr. in a September 2005 NBC Katrina fundraiser, "A Concert For Hurricane Relief", that raised over $50 million.

As a composition from 1922, this song is in the public domain in the United States due to its copyright expiring.

== Other notable recordings ==
- The Georgians - Columbia A-3804 (1922)
- Frankie Trumbauer and his Orchestra - Okeh 40843 with cornet solo by Bix Beiderbecke (1927)
- Red McKenzie with the Spirits of Rhythm - Decca 186 (1934)
- Bob Crosby - Decca 4403 (1942)
- Al Jolson and The Andrews Sisters (1950)
- Freddy Cannon - his hit single was included in the album The Explosive Freddy Cannon (1960)
- Bing Crosby and Louis Armstrong for their album Bing & Satchmo (1960)
- Bing Crosby for his album A Southern Memoir (1975)
- Connee Boswell (1945)
- Jan and Dean - included in their album Surf City And Other Swingin' Cities (1963)
- Dean Martin - for his album Swingin' Down Yonder (1955)
- Eydie Gormé - for the album Eydie In Dixie-Land (1960)
- Frankie Laine and Jo Stafford (1953) This charted briefly in the USA.
- Patti Page - for the album Let's Get Away from It All (1958)
- Layton & Johnstone - Columbia 4329 (1927)

== Film and television appearances ==
- The Story of Vernon and Irene Castle (1939)
- Is Everybody Happy (1943)
- Somebody Loves Me (1952) - sung by Betty Hutton
- The Benny Goodman Story (1955)
- The Gene Krupa Story (1959)
- Hey Arnold! (1998) - Episode: “The Flood”
- Boardwalk Empire (2012) - Episode: "Bone For Tuna"

== Lyrics ==
The song tells of New Orleans, the destination which the singer desires. The chorus is:

Way down yonder in New Orleans
In the land of dreamy scenes
There's a garden of Eden
That's what I mean,
Creole babies with flashing eyes
Softly whisper with tender sighs— Stop!
Oh! won't you give your lady fair a little smile, Stop!
You bet your life you'll linger there— a little while
There is heaven right here on earth
With those beautiful queens,
Way down yonder in New Orleans

Second chorus ending:

They've got angels right here on earth
Wearing little blue jeans,
Way down yonder in New Orleans.

== Bibliography ==
- Layton, John Turner; Creamer, Henry. "Way Down Yonder in New Orleans" (sheet music). New York: Shapiro, Bernstein & Co. (1922).
