= Trillium (opera cycle) =

- Opera cycle by Anthony Braxton
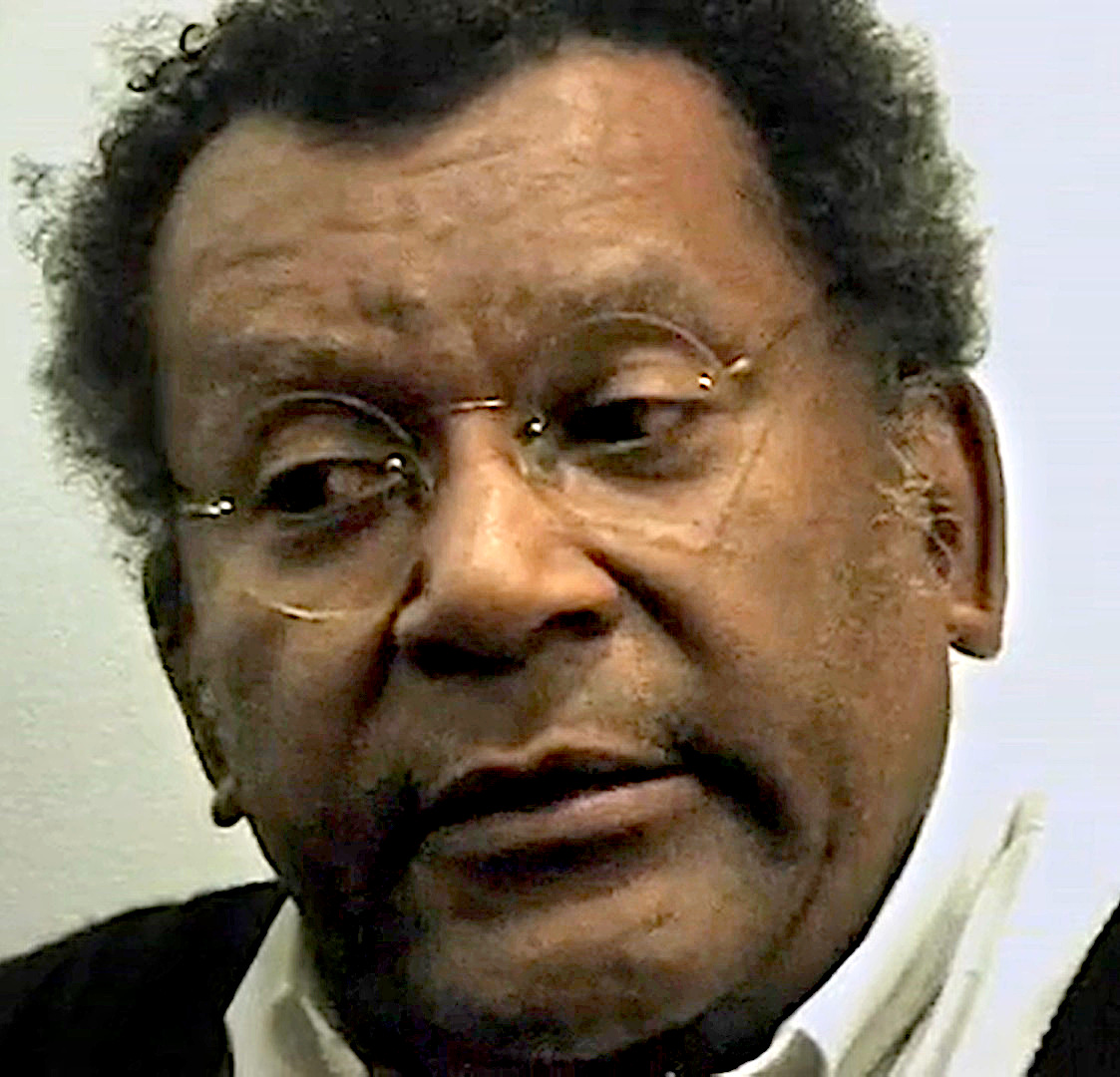
- Anthony Braxton
- Opus: 120, 126, 162, 237, 380, 396
- Composed: 1984–present

Trillium is an ongoing opera cycle being composed by Anthony Braxton. The cycle is planned to consist of 12 operas, each comprising 1 to 5 acts that can be performed in any order by ensembles of varying size. Each opera explores different philosophical frameworks developed by Braxton in his Tri-Axium Writings.

Composition of the cycle began in the 1980s with Trillium A, and continues through the most recent addition, Trillium X, completed in 2014.

== Composition ==
When first composing Trillium, Braxton was inspired by Richard Wagner and the recitative nature of Wagner's libretto. He composed in a layered structure. First the libretto was composed. Second is solo instruments, which switch between performing notated counter melodies and improvisation. Third is the orchestra.

The operas were constructed with an emphasis on modularity. Acts of different operas may be shuffled together in a given performance, and instrumentation may be as large or small as possible.

=== Narrative Elements ===
Instead of a traditional plot structure, each opera is a series of dialogues across multiple acts. Each opera explores different philosophical ideas. Characters that appear across acts may have different motivations and roles in each one.

Braxton draws on various aspects of popular culture for the plotlines. These include the antebellum period, courtroom dramas, sci-fi, and gangsters. He describes the narrative being used to elaborate on his philosophical ideas as the "apparent story."

=== Characters ===
Across the 36 acts there are 12 re-occurring characters. While having the same name, these figures assume different roles and motivations across each act. Each character has a consistent vocal range.

Voice Type	Name			
Soprano	Helena	Sundance	Shala	Ntzockie
Mezzo-Soprano	Alva	Kim		
Tenor	David	Ojuqwain	Joreo	
Baritone	Bubba John Jack	Ashmenton		
Bass	Zakko			

=== Philosophy ===
The underlying theme of each opera and act is based on philosophical frameworks found in Braxton's 1985 text the Tri-Axium Writings. Each opera focuses on a single concept, with individual acts exploring it through different scenarios. Key figures in these acts are consistent, but their role and motivations in the story may change.

Each opera's score includes diagrams from the Tri-Axium Writings illustrating how these concepts interact.

These concepts highlighted in each opera are as follows:

- Trillium A: Transformation
- Trillium M: Value Systems
- Trillium R: Attraction
- Trillium E: Principle Information
- Trillium J: Affinity Dynamics
- Trillium X: (Unreleased)

== Operas ==
=== Trillium A: ...After a Period of Change Zakko Returns to His Place of Birth ===
A one-act opera composed in 1984 and premiered on March 16, 1985. Each of the six principal characters is shadowed by an improvising instrumentalist. Characters in this opera speak with each other, members of the audience, and members of the orchestra.

=== Trillium M: Joreo's Vision of Forward Motion ===
A one-act opera composed in 1985 and premiered in 1994.

==== Instrumentation ====
2 trumpets, 1 trombone, 1 tuba, 3 reeds, 2 violins, 1 viola, 1 cello, 4 voices, 1 harp, 1 guitar, 1 keyboard, 1 piano, 1 bass, percussion, 1 tuned percussion

=== Trillium R: Shala Fears For the Poor ===
Composed in 1991 and premiered on October 25, 1996.

==== Instrumentation ====
6 Violins, 2 Violas, 2 cellos, 2 Basses, 2 flutes, 3 clarinets, 1 bass clarinet, 1 soprano sax, 1 oboe, 1 accordion, 1 bassoon, 1 alto sax, 2 trumpets, 2 French horns, 1 trombone, 1 tuba, 3 percussion, 1 harp, 9 singers

Trillium R features 9 instrumental soloists

1 tenor sax, 1 flute, 1 oboe, 1 bass clarinet, 1 clarinet, 1 baritone sax, 1 trombone, 1 English horn, 1 soprano sax

=== Trillium E: Wallingford's Polarity Gambit ===
A four-act opera composed in 1999 and recorded on March 18, 2010. The concepts of principle dynamics are explored over four acts that include a genie in a bottle, the invention of human cloning, interplanetary space travel, and jungle pyramid exploration.

==== Instrumentation ====
3 flutes, 2 oboes, 2 English horns, 3 clarinets, 1 alto clarinet, 2 bass clarinets, 2 contrabass clarinets, 2 bassoons, 1 contrabassoon, 1 French horn, 2 trumpets, 2 trombones, 1 bass trombone, 1 tuba, 2 percussion, 1 piano, 1 harp, 8 violins, 3 violas, 3 cellos, 3 basses, 12 singers

Trillium E features 12 instrumental soloists

1 piccolo, 1 flute, 1 oboe, 1 English horn, 1 clarinet, 1 alto clarinet, 1 bass clarinet, 1 soprano sax, 1 alto sax, 1 trumpet, 1 trombone, 1 tuba

=== Trillium J: The Non-Unconfessionables ===
A four-act opera composed in 2009 and premiered on April 19, 2014.

==== Instrumentation ====
8 violins, 3 violas, 3 cellos, 3 basses, 2 flutes, 3 oboes, 3 English horns, 5 clarinets, 5 saxophones, 2 bassoons, 2 French horns, 2 trumpets, 2 trombones, 1 tuba, 1 percussion, 1 harp, 12 vocalists

Trillium J features 12 instrumental soloists

1 French horn, 1 baritone horn, 1 alto saxophone, 1 soprano saxophone, 1 flute, 1 clarinet, 1 tuba, 1 trombone, 1 trumpet, 1 English horn, 1 bass clarinet, 1 oboe

=== Trillium X ===
Composed in 2014 and premiered on August 1, 2023.

=== Trillium L ===
Yet to be completed five-act opera.

=== Planned Operas ===
Following Trillium L, Braxton plans to compose five more operas. These will be two three-act operas, two two-act operas, and a final opera "requiring triple the performance forces as the others."

== Analysis ==
Author and researcher Graham Lock suggests that the stories used to elaborate Braxton's philosophical concepts are critiques on racism, capitalism, imperialism, and the current state of western culture. Braxton has disputed this interpretation.
