= Dear Old Southland =

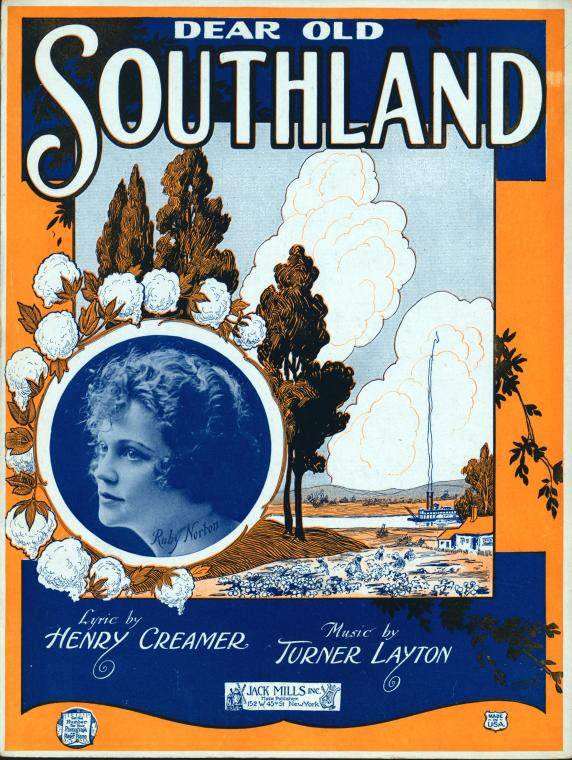
Sheet music cover, 1921

"Dear Old Southland" is a 1921 jazz standard. It was composed by Turner Layton, with lyrics by Henry Creamer. It uses basically the same melody as the song Deep River. Popular recordings in 1922 were by Paul Whiteman and by Vernon Dalhart. Jack Mills published sheet music for it.

== Other recordings ==
- Louis Armstrong recorded the song on April 5, 1930, for Okeh Records (catalog No. 41454). Armstrong recorded the song again in 1956 for the album Satchmo: A Musical Autobiography.
- Duke Ellington and His Orchestra – December 4, 1933 for Victor Records (catalog No. 24501).
- Benny Goodman and His Orchestra – June 25, 1935 for Victor Records (catalog No. 25136).
- Paul Robeson – September 26, 1939 for Victor Records (catalog No. 26741).
- Sidney Bechet's Blue Note Quartet – March 27, 1940 for the Blue Note label (catalog No. 13).
- Al Hirt released a version on his 1963 album, Our Man in New Orleans.
- Allen Toussaint released his own arrangement of Dear Old Southland (credited under Raymond Bloch), as a duet between a dominant piano part and a lamenting trumpet part (played by Nickholas Payton), on his jazz album of 2009 The Bright Mississippi.

== Lyrics ==
The lyrics of the 1921 version, which is out of copyright, are:

Chorus
Dear old Southland,
I hear you calling me.
And I long how I long to roam,
Back to my old Kentucky home.

Verse 1
Dear old Southland,
For you my heart is yearning,
And I long just to see once more,
The land I love the Swanee shore.

Verse 2
I want to stray the town I was born, my home town, my little home town.
I want to play in the cotton and corn, to feel it, I used to steal it.
I want to hear dear old mother each morn.
Saying 'go long', 'go long', 'go long, 'go long to school
I want to be where the levee is near the water, I love the water.
I want to see Mammy Jinny so dear, I love her, Because I oughta.
I want to hear pick a ninnies in tune,
Singing 'go long', 'go long', 'go long', 'go long yo' mule!

== See also ==
- List of jazz standards
