= 20 Standards (Quartet) 2003 =

Live album by Anthony Braxton
- Released: August 23, 2005
- Recorded: February 19 to November 20, 2003 in Europe
- Genre: Jazz
- Length: 298:16
- Label: Leo LR 431/434
- Producer: Anthony Braxton and Leo Feigin

Anthony Braxton chronology
23 Standards (Quartet) 2003 (2003)	20 Standards (Quartet) 2003 (2005)	19 Standards (Quartet) 2003 (2003)

20 Standards (Quartet) 2003 is a live album 4CD box set by American composer and saxophonist Anthony Braxton recorded in Europe in 2003 and released on the Leo label in 2005.

== Reception ==
Professional ratings
Review scores
Source	Rating
AllMusic	4/5 stars
All About Jazz	4.5/5 stars
The Penguin Guide to Jazz Recordings	3/4 stars

The AllMusic review by François Couture states:

...one is struck by the multifaceted balance of the album as a whole... Braxton pays a loving tribute to each tune, respecting the melody, pushing it beyond the composer's wildest dreams, taking it apart and reassembling it in the most natural-sounding way. ...These are masterfully creative revisitations of chunks of jazz history, big and small.

— Couture, François. Anthony Braxton – 20 Standards (Quartet) 2003: Review at AllMusic. Retrieved March 25, 2015.

All About Jazz reviewer Christinan Carey noted:

Much of the repertoire featured here was integral to the cool jazz of the fifties, but the quartet tears into it like it was written yesterday. ...If you want to hear your favorite old standards sounding brand new again, this set fits the bill.

— Carey, C. (June 30, 2005). "All About Jazz Review".

== Track listing ==
Disc One:

1. "All the Things You Are" (Jerome Kern, Oscar Hammerstein II) - 20:08
2. "Lines for Lyons" (Gerry Mulligan) - 13:53
3. "April in Paris" (Vernon Duke, Yip Harburg) - 12:25
4. "Green Dolphin Street" (Bronisław Kaper, Ned Washington) - 16:07
5. "Blues for Alice" (Charlie Parker) - 13:32

Disc Two:

1. "Alone Together" (Howard Dietz, Arthur Schwartz) - 18:32
2. "Waltz for Debbie" (Bill Evans) - 12:28
3. "For Heaven's Sake" (Elise Bretton, Sherman Edwards, Donald Meyer) - 13:40
4. "Freedom Jazz Dance" (Eddie Harris) - 14:48
5. "The Song Is You" (Kern, Hammerstein) - 19:12

Disc Three:

1. "The Duke" (Dave Brubeck) - 12:24
2. "I Love You" (Cole Porter) - 13:48
3. "Lonnie's Lament" (John Coltrane) - 8:05
4. "Blue Rondo à la Turk" (Brubeck) - 14:42
5. "Invitation" (Kaper) - 17:09

Disc Four:

1. "Tune Up" (Miles Davis) - 19:15
2. "Remember" (Irving Berlin) - 18:03
3. "Moonlight in Vermont" (John Blackburn, Karl Suessdorf) - 15:05
4. "Take Five" (Paul Desmond) - 10:24
5. "Serenity" (Joe Henderson) - 13:25
- Recorded on February 19 at De Singel in Antwerp, Belgium (Disc Three: tracks 1, 3, & 5 and Disc Four: track 5), on February 22 at Flagey in Brussels, Belgium (Disc Three: track 4), on November 11 at Teatro Central in Sevilla, Spain (Disc Four: track 1), on November 12 at New Morning in Paris, France (Disc Two: track 5 and Disc Four: track 2), on November 13 at Nevers Jazz Festival in Nevers, France (Disc One: tracks 1 & 3–5), on November 14 at The Vooruit in Gent, Belgium (Disc Two: tracks 1–4, Disc Three: track 2 and Disc For: track 3), on November 17 at Teatro Filarmonico in Verona, Italy (Disc Four: track 4), and on November 20 at Auditorio da Universidade de Minho in Guimaraes, Portugal (Disc One: track 2)

== Personnel ==
- Anthony Braxton - reeds
- Kevin O'Neil - guitar
- Andy Eulau - bass
- Kevin Norton - percussion
