= Goodbye Alexander, Goodbye Honey Boy =

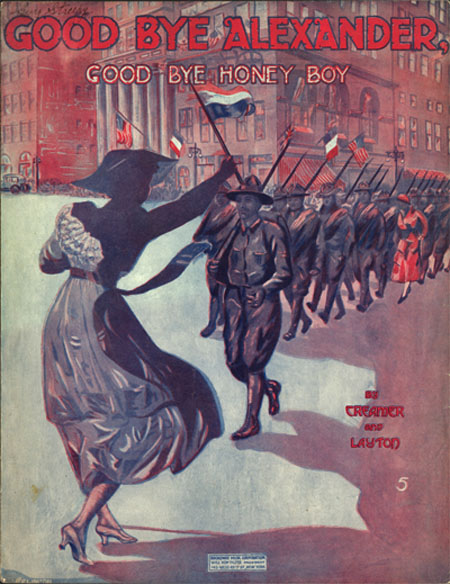
- Sheet music cover for a patriotic Creamer & Turner song, 1918

Song
- Language: English
- Published: Broadway Music Corporation
- Released: 1918
- Songwriter(s): Henry Creamer and Turner Layton

"Goodbye Alexander, Goodbye Honey Boy" is a World War I song describing an African American soldier going off to war and his girlfriend's reaction in his military service. The song is credited to Henry Creamer and Turner Layton, the writers of Sweet Emalina, My Gal and After You've Gone.

== Themes ==
The song mostly focuses on the words, actions, and feelings of Dinah Lee, girlfriend of the eponymous soldier Alexander Cooper, as he marches to a troop ship to embark for France to fight in the war. Written by famous African-American songwriters Henry Creamer and Turner Layton, the song bucks the contemporary popular trend of minstrel songs and coon songs. Instead black soldiers are portrayed similarly to white ones, as heroes going off to war and leaving loved ones behind. Several lines echo themes common to many World War I popular songs: the longing of those at home for the return of the soldiers ("I'll be waiting like Poor Butterfly"); pride in the soldiers' service ("Dressed up in that uniform you fills my heart with joy"); and certainty in eventual victory ("So get busy with that gun and don't come back 'till you've won"). There's also tongue-in-cheek wordplay common to popular songs of the era ("You left that window open and they got you in the draft").

== Lyrics ==
The song starts off by setting a patriotic scene as a black regiment marches off to war, referencing emancipation to highlight the significance of the troops being African-American.

Alexander Cooper was a colored trooper
with his regiment he marched away
Bands were gaily playing, colored folks were swaying
on Emancipation Day.

The two verses describe Dinah Lee's reaction to her boyfriend's presence among the troops, with the chorus being sung in her voice.

Goodbye Alexander, goodbye honey boy
Dressed up in that uniform, you fills my heart with joy
Alexander Cooper was a colored trooper
You ain't born for mopin', boy you sure can laugh
But you left that window open and they got you in the draft.
Alexander, I'll save my lovin' for you
I'll be waiting like Poor Butterfly

== Recordings ==
The song was recorded by different artists and a number of variations found their way into these recordings. Marion Harris recorded a version for Victor Records that included a lengthy monologue while a version recorded by Ada Jones for Edison Records dispensed with this. Wilbur Sweatman's Original Jazz Band and the Farber Sisters also recorded the song for Columbia Records.
