= 3 Compositions of New Jazz =

Studio album by Anthony Braxton
- Released: 1968
- Recorded: March 27 & April 10, 1968
- Studio: Sound, Chicago
- Genre: Jazz
- Length: 43:31
- Label: Delmark
- Producer: Robert G. Koester

Anthony Braxton chronology
3 Compositions of New Jazz (1968)	For Alto (1969)

3 Compositions of New Jazz is the debut album by Anthony Braxton, released in 1968 on the Delmark label. It features performances by Braxton, violinist Leroy Jenkins and trumpeter Wadada Leo Smith with pianist Muhal Richard Abrams appearing on two tracks.

== Reception ==
The AllMusic review by Thom Jurek stated: "This is a long and tough listen, but it's a light one in comparison to For Alto. And make no mistake: It is outrageously forward-thinking, if not—arguably—downright visionary. Braxton's 3 Compositions of New Jazz is an essential document of the beginning of the end".

Professional ratings
Review scores
Source	Rating
AllMusic	4.5/5 stars
The Encyclopedia of Popular Music	4/5 stars
MusicHound Jazz	3.5/5 stars
The Penguin Guide to Jazz	3/4 stars
The Rolling Stone Album Guide	5/5 stars

== Track listing ==
No.	Title	Writer(s)	Length
1.	"(840m)-Realize-44M-44M (Composition 6 E)"	Anthony Braxton	20:03
2.	"N-M488-44M-Z (Composition 6 D)"	Braxton	12:57
3.	"The Bell"	Wadada Leo Smith	10:31

- Tracks 1–2 are graphically titled. This is an attempt to translate the titles.

Recorded at Sound Studios, Chicago, March 27 (track 1) and April 10 (tracks 2–3), 1968

== Personnel ==
- Anthony Braxton – alto saxophone, soprano saxophone, clarinet, flute, piccolo oboe, accordion, bells, snare drum, mixer
- Leroy Jenkins – violin, viola, harmonica, bass drum, recorder, cymbals, slide whistle
- Wadada Leo Smith – trumpet, mellophone, xylophone, kazoo
- Muhal Richard Abrams – piano (track 2 & 3), cello, alto clarinet (track 3)
