= 19 Standards (Quartet) 2003 =

Live album by Anthony Braxton
- Released: July 5, 2010
- Recorded: February 19 to November 20, 2003 in Europe
- Genre: Jazz
- Length: 272:04
- Label: Leo LR 572/575
- Producers: Anthony Braxton and Leo Feigin

Anthony Braxton chronology
20 Standards (Quartet) 2003 (2003)	19 Standards (Quartet) 2003 (2010)	GTM (Outpost) 2003 (2003)

19 Standards (Quartet) 2003 is a live album 4CD box set by American composer and saxophonist Anthony Braxton recorded in Europe in 2003 and released on the Leo label in 2010.

== Reception ==
Professional ratings
Review scores
Source	Rating
AllMusic	4.5/5 stars
All About Jazz	4/5 stars

The AllMusic review by arwulf arwulf states, "This was the third four-CD set drawing upon recordings from the group's European tours during that busy and productive year. The creative small group dynamic developed by Braxton over several decades is very much in evidence as he interacts with bassist Andy Eulau, percussionist Kevin Norton, and guitarist Kevin O'Neil. Braxton's choices are astute and varied enough to make this an exceptionally satisfying effort". All About Jazz reviewer Glenn Astarita noted "they inject a modernist edge into the roads previously traveled. With sterling musicianship, the quartet expressively melds sheer firepower with elegance, and a persuasive mode of execution, which seeds a refreshing ambiance into these time-honored standards".

== Track listing ==
Disc One:

1. "Four" (Miles Davis) – 8:24
2. "Body and Soul" (Johnny Green, Robert Sour, Frank Eyton, Edward Heyman) – 17:03
3. "G. Petal (Improvisation)" (Anthony Braxton) – 5:48
4. "So Rare" (Jerry Herst, Jack Sharpe) – 15:27
5. "It's You or No One" (Sammy Cahn, Jule Styne) – 18:50

Disc Two:

1. "Half Nelson" (Davis) – 15:45
2. "Ruby, My Dear" (Thelonious Monk) – 15:08
3. "The Girl from Ipanema" (Antônio Carlos Jobim, Vinícius de Moraes, Norman Gimbel) – 10:34
4. "Afternoon in Paris" (John Lewis) – 23:54

Disc Three:

1. "East of the Sun" (Brooks Bowman) – 20:17
2. "Afro Blue" (Mongo Santamaria) – 12:14
3. "Nancy (with the Laughing Face)" (Jimmy Van Heusen, Phil Silvers) – 13:32
4. "Little Melonae" (Jackie McLean) – 13:54
5. "What's New?" (Bob Haggart, Johnny Burke) – 11:55

Disc Four:

1. "Minority" (Gigi Gryce) – 10:15
2. "Inch Worm" (Frank Loesser) – 13:33
3. "Mr. P.C." (John Coltrane) – 16:13
4. "Dear Old Stockholm" (Traditional) – 9:19
5. "Like Someone in Love (Van Heusen, Burke) – 19:59
- Recorded on February 19 at De Singel in Antwerp, Belgium (Disc Two: track 1 & Disc Four: track 1), on February 21 at Teatro Donizetti in Bergamo, Italy (Disc One: track 1 & Disc Three: tracks 1–4), on February 22 at Flagey in Brussels, Belgium (Disc One: track 3, Disc Two: track 4, Disc Three: track 5 & Disc Four: track 5), on November 11 at Teatro Central in Sevilla, Spain (Disc One: track 5 & Disc Two: track 3), on November 13 at Nevers Jazz Festival in Nevers, France (Disc Four: track 2), on November 14 at The Vooruit in Gent, Belgium (Disc One: track 2), on November 17 at Teatro Filarmonico in Verona, Italy (Disc Two: track 2), on November 19 at Culturgest in Lisbon, Portugal (Disc Four: tracks 3 & 4), and on November 20 at Auditorio da Universidade de Minho in Guimaraes, Portugal (Disc One: track 4)

== Personnel ==
- Anthony Braxton – reeds
- Kevin O'Neil – guitar
- Andy Eulau – bass
- Kevin Norton – percussion
