= On the Alamo =

1922 song by Isham Jones, Gilbert Keyes (Gus Kahn) and Joe Lyons

- 1922 On the Alamo sheet music cover

Single by Isham Jones Orchestra
- A-side: "By The Sapphire Sea"
- Published: March 17, 1922 Tell Taylor, Inc., Chicago, assigned on August 2, 1922 to Forster Music Publisher, Inc.
- Released: April 1922
- Recorded: February 1922
- Studio: Brunswick Studios, New York City
- Genre: American Dance Music, Jazz
- Length: 3:02
- Label: Brunswick 2245
- Composer(s): Isham Jones
- Lyricist(s): Gilbert Keyes, Joe Lyons

Isham Jones Orchestra singles chronology
"Wabash Blues" (1921)	"On the Alamo" (1922)	"The World Is Waiting for the Sunrise" (1922)

Audio sample
- Recording of On the Alamo, performed by the Benson Orchestra of Chicago (1922): file; help

"On the Alamo" is a 1922 composition by Isham Jones, with lyrics by Gus Kahn (under the nom-de-guerre of Gilbert Keyes) and Joe Lyons. Jones and his Orchestra recorded it at Brunswick Studios in New York City in February without a vocalist, as was his custom at the time, and it was released as the b-side of "By the Sapphire Sea" on Brunswick 2245 in April.

On March 17, a copyright was filed by Tell Taylor, Inc., of Chicago, Illinois, possibly the last song published by William 'Tell' Taylor, who sold his business to Forster Music Publisher, Inc., and retired to Ohio, where he bought a home for his parents. 'Sapphire Sea' failed to make the charts, but by mid-Summer, 'On the Alamo' hit number 1 for four weeks., and finished as the 7th highest ranking single for 1922.

== Notable versions ==
=== 78 RPM ===
- Isham Jones Orchestra - Brunswick 2245 (B-side of "By the Sapphire Sea"), April 1922
- Benson Orchestra of Chicago - Victor 18931-B (B-side of "Don't Bring Me Posies"), September 1922
- Rudy Vallée and his Connecticut Yankees - Victor 22084 (B-side of "Do You Love Me?"), 1929
- Benny Goodman, featuring Art Lund - Columbia 36988, 1946 (B-side was "Rattle and Roll")

=== LP ===
- Jo Stafford - Starring Jo Stafford, 1953
- Dave Brubeck - Dave Brubeck at Storyville: 1954 / Vol. 1, 1954
- Toots Thielemans - The Sound: The Amazing Jean "Toots" Thielemans, 1955
- Stan Getz - Split Kick, 1955
- Tal Farlow - A Recital by Tal Farlow, 1955
- Oscar Peterson - Nostalgic Memories, recorded 1949–51, released on LP, 1956 (re-issued on CD in 2009 as Debut: The Clef/Mercury Duo Recordings 1949-1951)
- Bing Crosby - New Tricks, 1957 (reissued on LP in 1964 as Songs Everybody Knows, and on CD in 1998 in Some Fine Old Chestnuts and New Tricks, and in 2009 in The Bing Crosby CBS Radio Recordings: 1954-56)
- Ted Heath and His Music - Ted Heath's First American Tour, 1957
- Thad Jones - Keeping Up With the Joneses: featuring The Jones Brothers - playing the music of Thad Jones and Isham Jones, 1958, with brothers Thad, Hank and Elvin Jones, as well as bassist Eddie Jones (unrelated) (re-issued in 1999 by Verve as Keeping Up With the Joneses)
- The Al Cohn-Zoot Sims Quintet - You 'n Me, 1960 (re-issued by Polygram in 1981, and on CD by Verve in 2002)
- Betty Carter - The Modern Sound of Betty Carter, recorded August 19, 1960, released 1961 (re-issued in 1976 on Impulse Records as part of the 2-record set, What a Little Moonlight Can Do, and in 1992 by GRP as part of the CD I Can't Help It, and in 2012 by American Jazz Classics as part of the CD, The Modern Sound of Betty Carter / Out There)
- The Hi-Lo's - This Time It's Love, 1962 (re-issued in 2003 by Sony Music Entertainment as part of the CD This Time It's Love - plus 14 Bonus Tracks)
- The Art Van Damme Quintet - Blue World, 1970, with Joe Pass and Eberhard Weber (re-issued in 1995 by MPS Records as part of the CD Two Originals: Keep Going, Blue World)
- Bing Crosby - A Southern Memoir, 1975 (reissued on CD in 2010)
- Zoot Sims - The Swinger, 1981 (re-issued on CD by Pablo Records in 1995, and as streaming audio by Naxos Music Library in 2008, as The Swingers)
