= Layton & Johnstone =

American vocal & piano duo

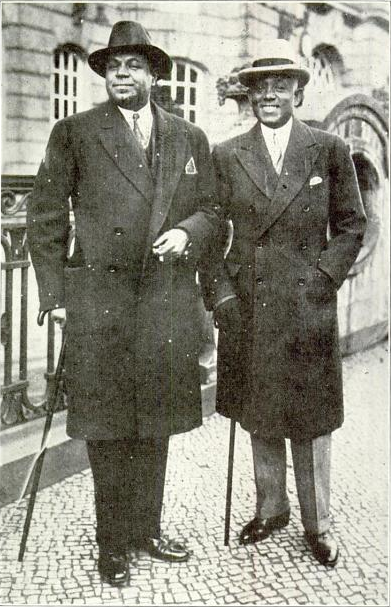
- Turner Layton and Clarence "Tandy" Johnstone. From The Crisis, January 1933.

Background information
- Origin: New York City
- Years active: 1922–1935
- Label: Columbia Records
- Past members: Turner Layton; Clarence "Tandy" Johnstone

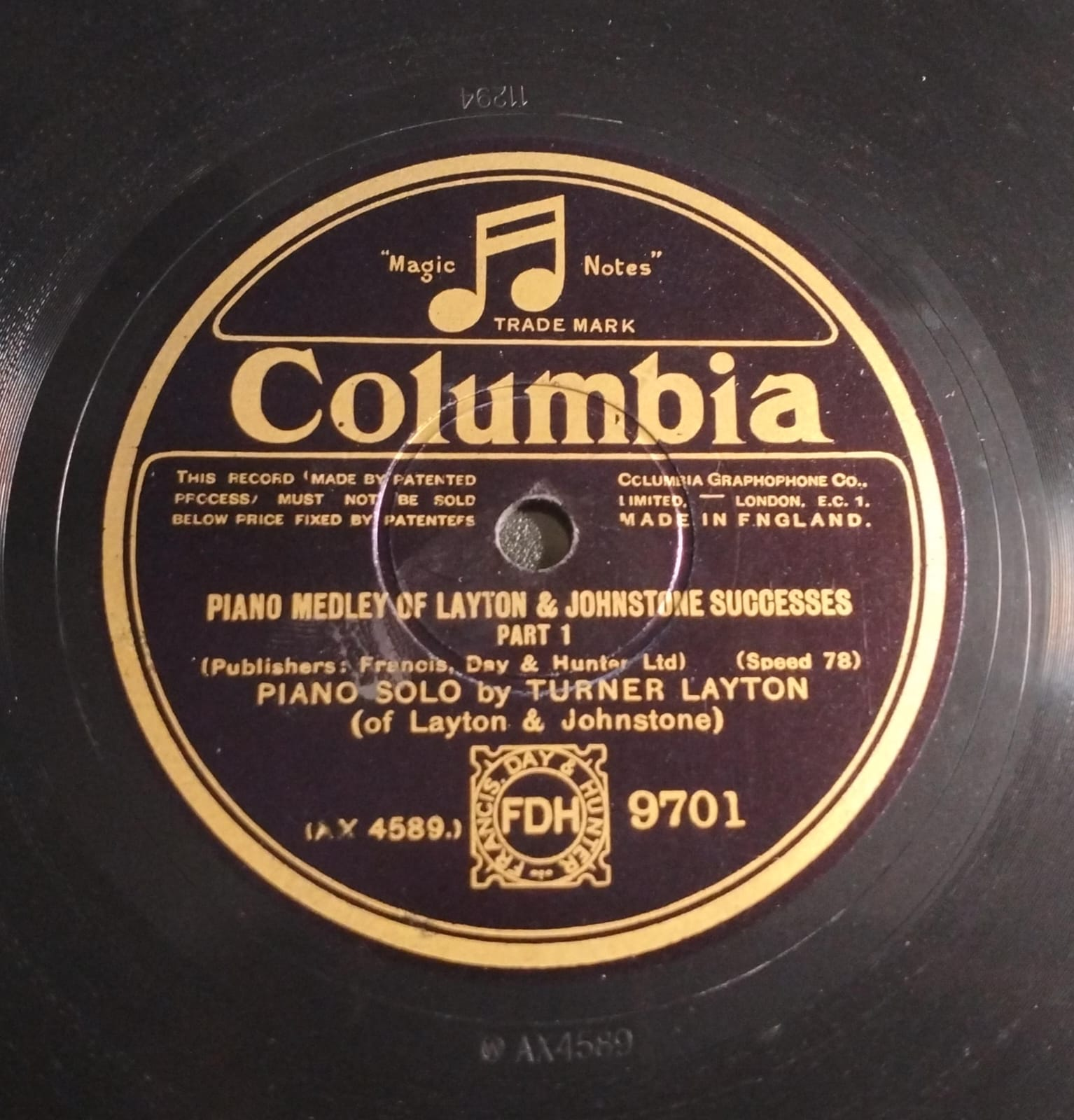
Medley of successful songs by the duo, released in 1929

Layton & Johnstone were an American vocal and piano duo in the 1920s and 1930s, consisting of Turner Layton and Clarence "Tandy" Johnstone. After forming in New York City in 1922, they moved to England two years later and met with immediate success. Between 1924 and 1935, they sold over 10 million records. They appeared at top venues in London, Paris and across Europe, and gave command performances for the British royal family on numerous occasions. They also appeared frequently on BBC Radio. The duo disbanded in 1935 after Clarence "Tandy" Johnstone became involved in a highly publicized divorce scandal.

== History ==
=== Early history ===
John Turner Layton Jr. (2 July 1894 – 6 February 1978), known as Turner Layton, was born in Washington, D.C., and in 1916 moved to New York City, where he soon formed a successful songwriting team with Henry Creamer. Clarence Nathaniel "Tandy" Johnstone (1885 – 1953) was an orthopedic surgeon from Manhattan who also worked as an entertainer.

After Layton's songwriting partnership with Creamer ended in 1922, he turned his attention to performing. Johnstone, speaking with a newspaper reporter in 1948, gave his version of meeting Layton and forming the duo. "It was in 1922, at the Biltmore Hotel, that I met Turner Layton. He was well known and was looking for a partner whose voice blended with his. We ran through 'Japanese Sandman'—and the team of Layton and Johnstone was born. It was a natural." The two performed in Harlem and at private parties for wealthy patrons that included members of the Astor and Vanderbilt families. In a 1984 article for The Black Perspective in Music, Henry Robsinon wrote that Layton & Johnstone "followed their clients to Palm Beach in the winter and to Newport in the summer, returning to New York for the autumn and spring." In Florida, Lord and Lady Mountbatten heard them perform and convinced them to go to England.

=== Career in England ===
Layton & Johnstone arrived in England in 1924, performing at exclusive London clubs such as the Kit Kat and large venues, like The Coliseum and The Holborn Empire. One of their fans was Edward, Prince of Wales, who would later become King Edward VIII. Robinson states, "The Prince took a liking to the talented pair and on several occasions invited them to entertain at his residence, St. James's Palace."

The duo also had successful engagements at major theatres across Europe, including Berlin, Brussels and in Paris at the Salle Pleyel. They were frequent performers on BBC Radio and appeared in a motion picture in 1931.

They recorded extensively for the British imprint of Columbia Records, scoring major hits with such songs as "All Alone," "(You Forgot to) Remember" and "Sonny Boy," the latter selling over a million copies. Peter Martland has stated that Layton & Johnstone were "amongst the most successful and prolific recording artists active in Britain during the period 1918 to 1931." A British review of Layton & Johnstone from 1924 said, "One partner is at the piano but both sing, and their vocal work is of capital quality, harmonies being delightfully done." Their performing and recording repertoire included many tunes that would become standards in the Great American Songbook, along with spirituals, blues, show tunes and other popular songs of the day. They recorded early versions of songs by composers such as Irving Berlin, George and Ira Gershwin, and Cole Porter.

In his book, Harlem in Montmartre, William A. Shack says, "Layton and Johnstone displayed a refined musical technique different from that of other black artists appearing in popular clubs in London and Paris. Their mixed repertoire of songs, including 'Dinah,' 'Hallelujah,' 'My Blue Heaven,' and 'Every Sunday Afternoon,' combined a touch of jazz with a nod toward Negro spirituals.... It was jazz in a form unusual for its time."

=== Break up and aftermath ===
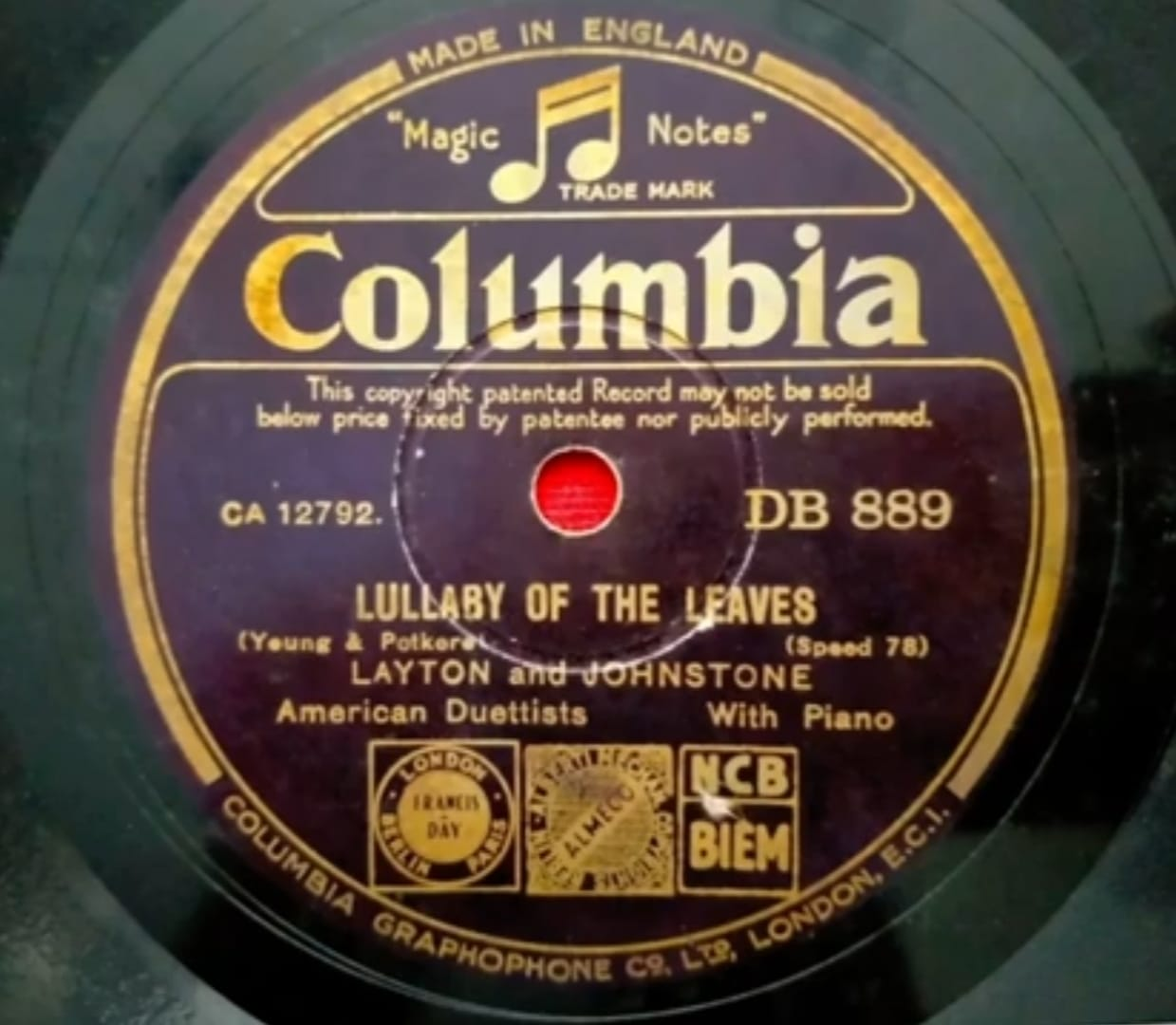
Layton & Johnstone's version of "Lullaby of the Leaves", released in 1932

In 1934, Clarence Johnstone became embroiled in a highly publicized divorce case, involving the wife of the popular orchestra leader and violinist Albert Sandler. The interracial affair caused a stir in England, leading the judge in the divorce case to warn the jury that when deciding damages, they must "get out of their heads any idea of vindictiveness because of colour." After finishing out their existing recording and performing contracts, Layton & Johnstone broke up the act in 1935.

Afterwards, Layton had a successful solo career, remaining in England until his death in 1978. Clarence Johnstone eventually married Raymonde Gilberte Defly Sandler in December 1935. He began a new partnership with Jules Bledsoe in early 1936, but the act broke up shortly thereafter. Johnstone and his wife eventually returned to New York City, where he died in 1953.

In recent years, the duo's music has found popularity from a more modern audience after many of their works (including "The Wedding of the Painted Doll", "Anytime, Anywhere", "Alabamy Bound", "Say it Isn't So" and many more) were sampled by The Caretaker in his albums An Empty Bliss Beyond This World and Everywhere at the End of Time.
