= Carolina in the Morning =

American popular song (1922)

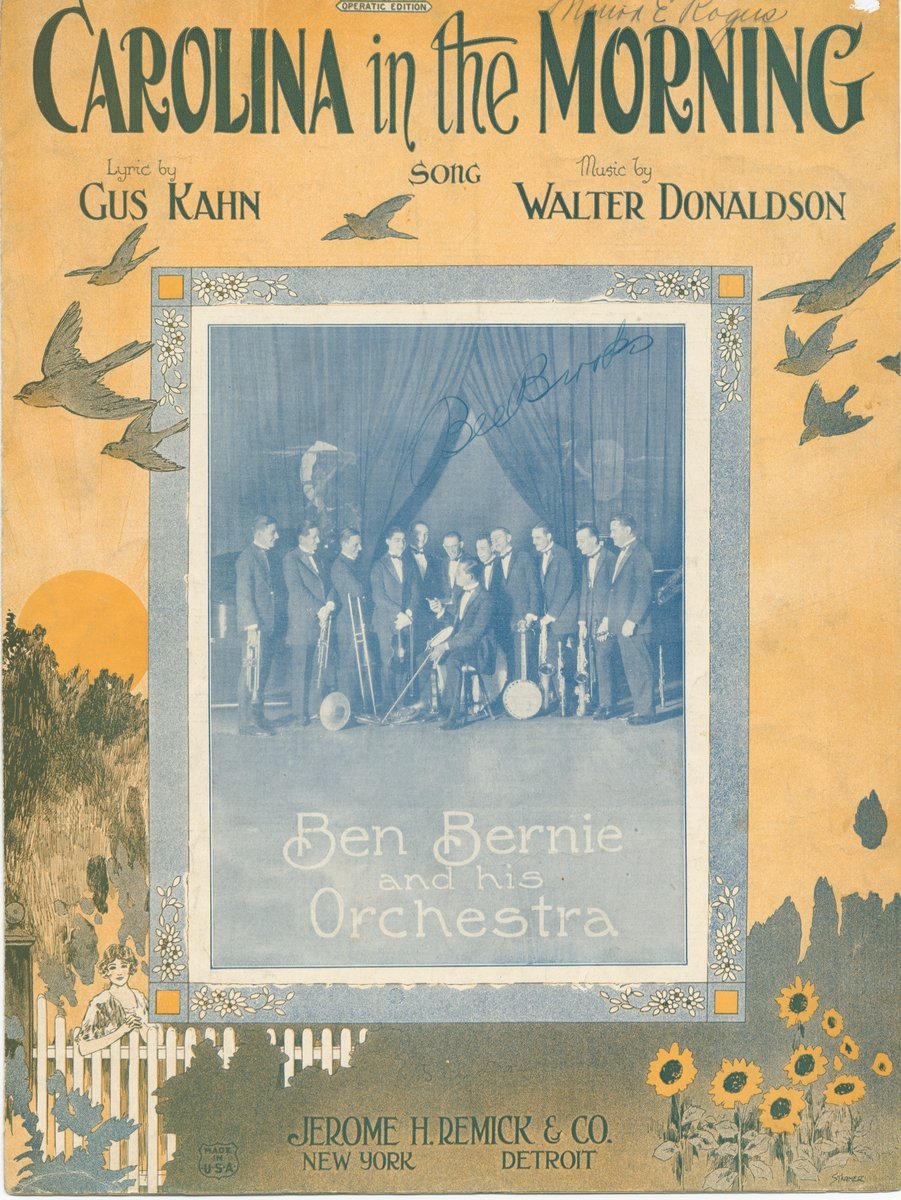
- Sheet music cover with Ben Bernie & His Orchestra

Song
- Published: 1922
- Genre: Popular
- Composer: Walter Donaldson
- Lyricist: Gus Kahn

Audio sample
- Recording of Carolina in the Morning, performed by Marion Harris (1922): file; help
- Recording by Van and Schenck (1922), which was one of the best-selling recordings of 1923: file; help

"Carolina in the Morning" is a popular song with words by Gus Kahn and music by Walter Donaldson, first published in 1922 by Jerome H. Remick & Co.

Sheet music of the operatic edition of Carolina in the Morning

== History ==
The song debuted on Broadway in the elaborate and risqué musical revue The Passing Show of 1922 at the Winter Garden Theater. Vaudeville performers incorporated it into their acts and helped popularize it. Among these was William Frawley, who later sang it in Paramount Pictures' original version of The Lemon Drop Kid in 1934, as well as the 1952 episode "Ricky Loses His Voice" of I Love Lucy, and the 1963 season 3 episode "Evening with a Star" of My Three Sons, where it generated moderate attention.

== Overview ==
Notable recordings when the song was new were made by such artists as Marion Harris, Van & Schenck, Paul Whiteman and the American Quartet.

"Carolina in the Morning" gradually became a standard, being revived regularly as a popular song into the 1950s. Al Jolson recorded it on June 11, 1947 and he featured it in the film Jolson Sings Again (1949). Danny Winchell had a hit with his version in 1952.

Other artists to have later successes with the song included Bing Crosby who recorded the song in 1956 for use on his radio show and it was subsequently included in the box set The Bing Crosby CBS Radio Recordings (1954-56) issued by Mosaic Records (catalog MD7-245) in 2009. He subsequently used it in his album A Southern Memoir. Other notable versions were by Dean Martin (for his album Swingin' Down Yonder), Jimmy Durante, Dinah Shore (for her album Dinah Down Home!), Judy Garland, and Danny Kaye. In 1957, Bill Haley & His Comets recorded a rock and roll version. Freddy Cannon recorded this song on his debut 1960 album The Explosive Freddy Cannon.

Barbara Cook recorded it live January 26, 1975, for her album Barbara Cook at Carnegie Hall. The album was a significant moment in her career, marking her successful transition into a concert performer.

== Appearances in film and television ==
- Hollywood Cavalcade (1939) – played by a studio orchestra for the "Common Clay" scene
- The Roaring Twenties (1939) – played when Eddie goes to the theater
- Greenwich Village (1944) – played when Querida first approaches Ken
- The Dolly Sisters (1945) – performed by Betty Grable and June Haver
- April Showers (1948)
- Jolson Sings Again (1949) – performed by Larry Parks (dubbed by Al Jolson).
- Always Leave Them Laughing (1949) – hummed by Alan Hale and underscoring dance by him, Grace Hayes, Ruth Roman (singing voice dubbed by Trudy Erwin) and Milton Berle.
- Look for the Silver Lining (1949) – played backstage when Marilyn first sees her family. Also performed by Ray Bolger on-stage
- Young Man with a Horn (1950) – played by Young Rick and other kids
- I'll See You in My Dreams (1951) – sung by Patrice Wymore (dubbed by Bonnie Lou Williams)
- I Love Lucy (1951–1957) – performed by Vivian Vance and William Frawley
- The Winning Team (1952) – played during the carnival dressing room scene
- Strangers on a Train (1951) – played when buying ice cream at the amusement park
- The Dick Van Dyke Show (1961–1966) – performed by Dick Van Dyke and Mary Tyler Moore
- Con Air (1997)
- 28 Days (2000) – performed by Mitch Miller
- Modern Family (2019, season 10, episode 22) – performed by Jesse Tyler Ferguson and Eric Stonestreet

== Lyrics ==
The original 1922 lyrics are now public domain in the United States due to age. The chorus remains well known, but the verses have generally been omitted from vocal performances since the early years of the song's popularity. The verses give a hint of melancholy to the song, while the chorus on its own can be an almost ecstatic reverie.

The popular chorus has a catchy melody, constructed more creatively by Walter Donaldson than most Tin Pan Alley popular songs of the era. Gus Kahn's clever lyrics use playful wording and subsidiary rhymes within lines in a manner found in some of the better novelty songs of the era, but seldom found in songs where the effect was romantic rather than comic.

== Use ==
"Carolina in the Morning" has been used in public celebrations in both North Carolina and South Carolina. It is also frequently sung by collegiate a cappella groups. The song was also recorded by Brent Spiner for his 1991 album Ol' Yellow Eyes Is Back. Among the more colorful renditions of this song was in the Warner Bros. cartoon Book Revue (1946) in which Daffy Duck sings a Russian-accented version, imitating a then-famous Danny Kaye characterization, saying "feener", "Caroleena", etc., while wearing a zoot suit. Moreover, Warner Bros. utilized the song as part of the musical score of many of its Merrie Melodies and Looney Tunes cartoons. In 1951, Alfred Hitchcock chose a mechanical-orchestra version to play at an amusement park as a prelude to Miriam's murder in Strangers on a Train.

Performance artist and comedian Andy Kaufman often performed the song as his character Tony Clifton, e.g., during The Midnight Special he hosted in 1981, and two years earlier, in 1979, at Carnegie Hall, where Kaufman appeared on stage with Clifton (presumably played by Bob Zmuda) for a duet.

The opening line of the song was spoofed in the 1997 film Con Air when Cyrus "the Virus" Grissom sings, "Oh, nothing makes me sadder than the agent lost his bladder in the airplane!" It was also spoofed as the title of a book by Charles Osgood: Nothing Could Be Finer Than a Crisis That Is Minor in the Morning.
