= Murry DePillars =

Murray DePillars (1938–2008) was a Chicago-born artist and educator and a member of AfriCOBRA. Educated in Chicago's public schools, DePillars earned Associate in Arts degree in Fine Arts from Kennedy-King Community College, a Bachelor of Arts degree in Art Education, a Master of Arts degree in Urban Studies from Roosevelt University, and a Ph.D. in Art Education from The Pennsylvania State University. He was assistant dean of the Virginia Commonwealth University (VCU) School of the Arts from 1971 to 1976, and dean of the school from 1976 until 1995. Among other places, his work has been shown at the Whitney Museum of American Art; The Studio Museum of Harlem; The Mississippi Museum of Art; The Orlando Museum of Art; The Museum of Contemporary Art in Chicago; the World Expo in Spokane; the Fay Gold Gallery in Atlanta; and the Joysmith Gallery & Studio in Memphis.
