= Henry Creamer =

American popular song lyricist (1879–1930)

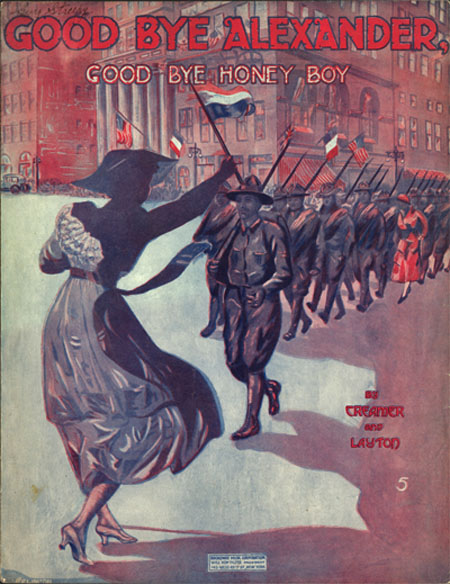
Sheet music cover for a patriotic Creamer & Turner song, 1918

Henry Sterling Creamer (June 21, 1879 – October 14, 1930) was a popular song lyricist and theater producer. He was born in Richmond, Virginia, and died in New York. He co-wrote many popular songs in the years from 1900 to 1929, often collaborating with Turner Layton, with whom he also appeared in vaudeville. He was African American.

== Career ==
Creamer was a singer, dancer, songwriter and stage producer/director. He first performed on the vaudeville circuit in the U.S. and in Europe as a duo with pianist Turner Layton, with whom he also co-wrote songs. Two of their most enduring songs, for which Creamer wrote the lyrics, are "After You've Gone" (1918), which was popularized by Sophie Tucker, and "Way Down Yonder in New Orleans" (1922), which was included in the soundtrack for one of the dance numbers in the Fred Astaire / Ginger Rogers 1939 movie The Story of Vernon and Irene Castle. Way Down Yonder in New Orleans became a hit again in 1959 when the rocked up recording by Freddy Cannon sold a million copies.

Success on Broadway arrived in 1922 when Creamer’s Creole Production Company produced the show Strut Miss Lizzie, and in 1923 to seal their success, Bessie Smith recorded their song "Whoa, Tillie, Take Your Time". Creamer's other Broadway stage scores include Three Showers. Creamer and Layton disbanded as a duo in 1924, when Layton relocated to Europe. He moved on to collaborate with other notable composers including J.C. Johnson, Jimmy Johnson, and vaudevillian Bert Williams. In 1924, Creamer joined ASCAP.

In the fall of 1926, Creamer was commissioned to direct the Cotton Club revue, The Creole Cocktail. The show featured Lottie Gee, Loncia Williams. Henry and LaPearl, Louie Parker, White and Sherman, Eddie Burke, Ruby Mason and Albertine Pickens.

Also in 1926, Creamer and James P. Johnson wrote "Alabama Stomp". In 1930, they achieved another hit with "If I Could Be with You", which was recorded by Ruth Etting. The song also became the theme song for McKinney's Cotton Pickers and was also a hit for Louis Armstrong (Okeh 41448).

Creamer was a co-founder with James Reese Europe of the Clef Club, an important early organization for African-American musicians and entertainers in New York City.

He died on October 14, 1930, at Mount Sinai Hospital (Manhattan) and was buried in Woodlawn Cemetery (Bronx, New York).

== Some notable works ==
- "Alabama Stomp" w. Henry Creamer m. James P. Johnson (1926)
- "If I Could Be with You (One Hour Tonight)" w. Henry Creamer m. James P. Johnson (1926)
- "'Way Down Yonder In New Orleans" w. Henry Creamer m. Turner Layton (1922)
- "Dear Old Southland" w. Henry Creamer m. Turner Layton (1921) (sung to basically the same tune as "Deep River")
- "Strut Miss Lizzie" w. Henry Creamer m. Turner Layton (1921)
- "After You've Gone" w. Henry Creamer m. Turner Layton (1918)
- "Ev'rybody's Crazy 'bout the Doggone Blues, But I'm Happy" w. Henry Creamer m. Turner Layton (1918)
- "Goodbye Alexander, Goodbye Honey Boy" w. Henry Creamer m. Turner Layton (1918)
- "My bluebird was caught in the rain" w. Henry Creamer m. Max Rich (1930)
- "The Bombo-Shay" by Henry Creamer (1917)
- "Sweet Emalina My Gal" w. Henry Creamer m. Turner Layton (1917)
- "That's A Plenty" w. Henry Creamer m. Bert A. Williams (1909)
- "Clementine (From New Orleans)" w. Henry Creamer m. Harry Warren (1927)
- "You Can't Shush Katie" (The Gabbiest Gal in Town) w. Henry Creamer m. Harry Warren (1925)
