= Turner Layton =

American singer, songwriter and pianist (1894–1978)

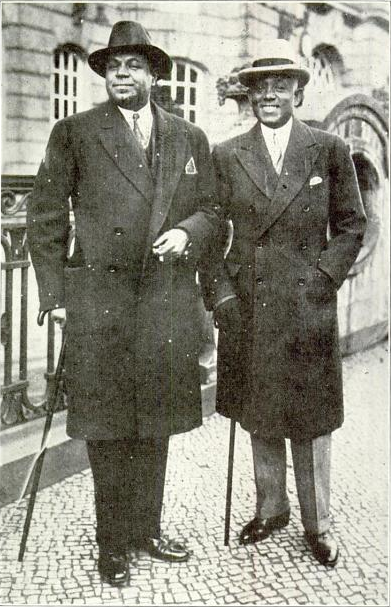
- Turner Layton (left) and his musical partner Clarence Johnstone in 1933

Background information
- Born: John Turner Layton, Jr. 2 July 1894; Washington, D.C., United States
- Died: 6 February 1978 (aged 83) London, England
- Genres: Jazz; vocal
- Occupations: Singer; songwriter; pianist
- Years active: 1918–1946

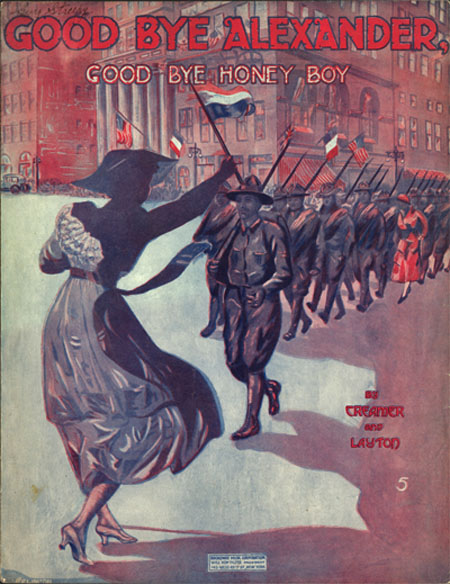
Sheet music cover for a patriotic Creamer & Layton song, 1918

Turner Layton (born John Turner Layton, Jr.; July 2, 1894 – February 6, 1978) was an American singer, songwriter and pianist. He frequently worked with Henry Creamer. Together with Clarence Johnstone, Layton was part of a double act, Layton & Johnstone, who were popular in Britain during the 1920s and 1930s.

== Life ==
Born in Washington, D.C., United States, in 1894, he was the son of John Turner Layton, "a bass singer, music educator and hymn composer." After receiving a musical education from his father, he attended the Howard University Dental School, later coming to New York City in the early 1900s, where he met future songwriting partner, lyricist Henry Creamer. Layton is best known for his many compositions with Creamer, the best known of which is the standard "After You've Gone", written in 1918 and first popularized by Sophie Tucker. Turner and Creamer had another hit with "Way Down Yonder in New Orleans" in 1922. It was recorded in 1927 by Frank Trumbauer (with Bix Beiderbecke), and was a rock and roll hit for Freddy Cannon in 1959. Creamer and Layton contributed music and lyrics to many Broadway shows, including the Ziegfeld Follies of 1917, 1921 and 1922, Three Showers (1920), Some Party (1922) and Creamer's own Strut Miss Lizzie (1922).

Beginning in 1924, Layton found major popular success in England with Clarence "Tandy" Johnstone as a member of the duo Layton & Johnstone, quickly earning a reputation as a cabaret act, with the pair allegedly selling over 10 million records. Layton split with Johnstone in 1935 (after Johnstone had been named in Albert Sandler's divorce), with Johnstone returning to New York and continuing to perform with significantly less success. Layton continued to perform in England. An elegant song stylist, he held a regular, successful spot over the years at the Café de Paris, a London club, until his retirement in 1946.

He died in London in February 1978, at the age of 83.

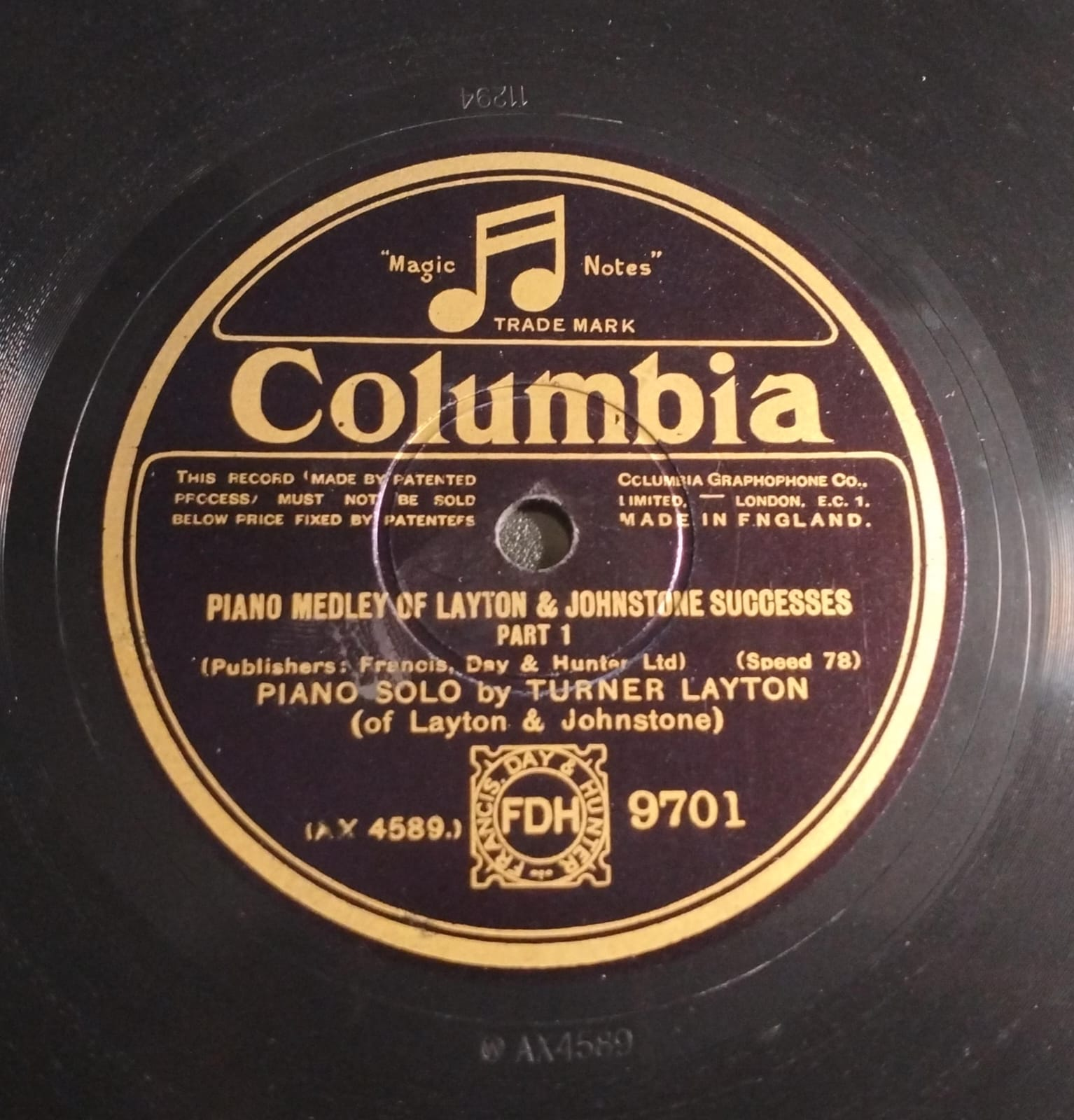
Turner Layton's piano medley record

== Recordings ==
Several compilations of Layton & Johnstone recordings have been issued in the UK. Two compilation albums of recordings by Layton have also been released on CD.

== Legacy ==
His daughter A'Lelia Shirley inherited his musical estate; she left the copyright and royalties to her father's music to Great Ormond Street Hospital for Children in London in her will on her death in January 2001.

== Notable compositions ==
- "After You've Gone"
- "Dear Old Southland"
- "Goodbye Alexander, Goodbye Honey Boy"
- "It Must Be Love"
- "Strut, Miss Lizzie"
- "'Way down Yonder in New Orleans"
