= List of songs about California =

List of songs about the U.S. state California

This is a list of songs written about the U.S. state of California or notable locations in the state. Of these, I Love You, California is the state song and regional anthem, originally published in 1913. It was adopted in 1951 and reconfirmed in 1987 as the official state song.

== Background ==
Much popular music is dedicated to California. Subjects, besides the state itself and places in it, include "hippies, gangstas, addicts, wannabees, and folks rotting in jail".

In the post-World War II years a popular image of California, especially South California, was formed, that of sun, beach, and leisure, with a special place for surfing in songs, to the extent that California displaced Hawaii as the "surfing capital" in popular perception.

== List ==
- "All the Gold in California" – It says that all the gold in the state "is in a bank in the middle of Beverly Hills in somebody else's name", and instead of success one may meet a devastating failure.
- "Boom (P.O.D. song)" – about the San Diego background of P.O.D.
- "California (Big & Rich song)"
- "California (Belinda Carlisle song)"
- "California (Delta Spirit song)"
- "California (Joni Mitchell song)"
- "California (Lenny Kravitz song)"
- "California (Mylène Farmer song)"
- "California (Phantom Planet song)"
- "California (Usher song)"
- "California (Wave song)"
- "California Autumn"
- "California Blue"
- "California Boy"
- "California Dreamin'"
- "California Feelin'"
- "California Girls"
- "California Girls (Gretchen Wilson song)"
- "California Love"
- "California Nights"
- "California Saga/California"
- "California Snow"
- "California Soul"
- "California Sun"
- "California Über Alles"
- "California, Here I Come"
- "Californication"
- "Compton"
- "Cruising California (Bumpin' in My Trunk)"
- "Folsom Prison Blues"
- "Going Back to Cali (LL Cool J song)"
- "Going Back to Cali (The Notorious B.I.G. song)"
- "Going to California"
- "I Love You, California" – the official state song and a regional anthem
- "It Never Rains in Southern California"
- "Surfin' U.S.A."
- "Take Me Down"

== See also ==
- List of songs about the San Francisco Bay Area
