= List of guests appearing on The Midnight Special =

This is a partial list of guests who appeared on The Midnight Special.

== Series overview ==
Season	Episodes	Originally aired	
Season	Episodes	Premiere	Finale
1	33	August 19, 1972	September 8, 1973
2	50	September 15, 1973	September 14, 1974
3	48	September 28, 1974	September 13, 1975
4	43	September 20, 1975	September 11, 1976
5	38	September 18, 1976	August 13, 1977
6	44	September 10, 1977	September 8, 1978
7	35	September 16, 1978	September 15, 1979
8	34	September 22, 1979	August 2, 1980
9	25	September 6, 1980	March 27, 1981

== Season 1 (1972–1973) ==
Episode	Host	Performers	Original airdate
1 (Pilot)	John Denver	John Denver - "Take Me Home, Country Roads" / "Goodbye Again"; John Denver and 'Mama' Cass Elliott - "Leaving on a Jet Plane"; Argent - "Hold Your Head Up" / "Tragedy"; Harry Chapin - "Taxi"; David Clayton-Thomas - "Yesterday's Music" / "Nobody Calls Me Prophet"; The Everly Brothers - "All I Have to Do Is Dream" / "Stories We Could Tell"; The Isley Brothers - "Pop That Thang"; Helen Reddy - "I Don't Know How to Love Him"; Linda Ronstadt - "Long Long Time" / "The Fast One"; War - "Slippin' into Darkness"	August 19, 1972
2	Helen Reddy	Helen Reddy - "I Am Woman" / "Peaceful" / "Come On John"; Ike & Tina Turner - "I Can't Turn You Loose" / "With a Little Help from My Friends"; George Carlin - Stand-up comedy monologue Curtis Mayfield - "Superfly"; Don McLean - "Dreidel" / "If We Try"; Rare Earth - "We're Gonna Have a Good Time" / "I Just Want to Celebrate"; Kenny Rankin - "Comin' Down"; The Byrds - "Mr. Tambourine Man" / "So You Want to Be a Rock 'n' Roll Star"; The Impressions - "Preacher Man"; Helen Reddy, Curtis Mayfield & the Impressions - "Amen"	February 3, 1973
3	Johnny Rivers	Johnny Rivers - "Blue Suede Shoes" / "Rockin' Pneumonia, Boogie Woogie Flu" / "Got My Mojo Workin'"; Ace Trucking Company - Comedy routine Albert Hammond - "It Never Rains in Southern California" / "If You Gotta Break Another Heart"; Merilee Rush - "Start Again" / "Comfort and Please You"; The Spinners - "Could It Be I'm Falling in Love" / "I'll Be Around"; Steely Dan - "Do It Again" / "Reeling in the Years"; Paul Williams - "Out in the Country" / "I Won't Last a Day Without You"; Wolfman Jack - "I Ain't Never Seen a White Man"	February 10, 1973
4	Mac Davis	Mac Davis - "Baby, Don't Get Hooked on Me" / "I Believe in Music" / "Dream Me Home" / "Home" / "Half and Half (Song for Sara)"; The Doobie Brothers - "Jesus Is Just Alright" / "Listen to the Music"; Waylon Jennings - "You Can Have Her"; Billy Paul - "Me and Mrs. Jones" / "Brown Baby"; Billy Preston - "Blackbird" / "Georgia on My Mind" / "That's the Way God Planned It"; Joan Rivers - Comedy segment	February 17, 1973
5	Harry Chapin	Harry Chapin - "Sunday Morning Sunshine" / "Sniper" / "Taxi"; Kerrie Biddell - "Spirit in the Dark"; Blood, Sweat & Tears - "Rosemary" / "Hip Pickles" / "Snow Queen"; The Committee - Comedy segment The Hollies - "Magic Woman Touch" / "He Ain't Heavy, He's My Brother"; Curtis Mayfield - "Freddie's Dead" / "Superfly"; Timmy Thomas - "Why Can't We Live Together"	February 24, 1973
6	Anne Murray	Anne Murray - "Snowbird" / "Danny's Song" / "I Know"; Anne Murray, Steve Martin and the Nitty Gritty Dirt Band - "Shuckin' the Corn"The Association - "Along Comes Mary" / "Crazy Songs and Loony Tunes" / "Names, Tags, Numbers and Labels"; Badfinger - "No Matter What" / "Suitcase"; Steve Martin - Comedy segment Don McLean - "Vincent" / "Dreidel" / "If We Try"; Sam Neely - "Loving You Just Crossed My Mind" & "Rosalie"; Nitty Gritty Dirt Band - "Jambalaya (On the Bayou)"; Sonny Terry and Brownie McGhee - "People Get Ready" / "Walkin' My Blues Away"	March 3, 1973
7	Paul Williams	Paul Williams - (Just An) Old Fashioned Love Song" / "Drift Away" / "That's Enough for Me"; Edward Bear - "Last Song" / "Close Your Eyes"; Loretta Lynn - "One's on the Way" / "Coal Miner's Daughter"; Seals & Crofts - "Hummingbird" / "Summer Breeze"; Sha Na Na - "Hound Dog" / "Yakety Yak" / "I Wonder Why"; Lakshmi Shankar - "Nata Nagara"; Ravi Shankar - "Tilak Shyam"	March 10, 1973
8	Paul Anka	Paul Anka, Bobby Darin, The Coasters, Ace Trucking Company, The Edwin Hawkins Singers, The Doobie Brothers, George Jones, Tammy Wynette	March 17, 1973
9	Lou Rawls	Lou Rawls, Brewer & Shipley, George Burns, Honey Cone, The Committee, The Grass Roots, The O'Jays, Eric Weissberg, Deliverance	March 24, 1973
10	Ray Charles	Ray Charles, The Raelettes, Bill Cosby, Carol Burnett, Aretha Franklin, The Earl Scruggs Revue, Freeman & Murray	March 31, 1973
11	The Bee Gees	The Bee Gees, Jerry Lee Lewis, Skeeter Davis, Gladys Knight & the Pips, Johnny Nash, Jim Weatherly, Frank Welker	April 7, 1973
12	Bill Cosby	Bill Cosby, David Brenner, Ray Charles, Waylon Jennings, Billy Preston, Steely Dan, Taj Mahal	April 14, 1973
13	Doc Severinsen	Doc Severinsen, Henry Mancini, Hoyt Axton, Jerry Butler, Dobie Gray, Carol Burnett, Vicki Lawrence, Country Joe McDonald and his All-Star Band, Hot Cup of Friends	April 21, 1973
14	Jerry Lee Lewis	Linda Gail Lewis, Freddie Cannon, Chubby Checker, Bobby Day, The Del Vikings, The Diamonds, The Penguins, Lloyd Price, Little Anthony, The Ronettes, The Shirelles	April 28, 1973
15	Johnny Nash	Johnny Nash (guest host) - "Stir It Up," "Groovy Feeling," "I Can See Clearly Now" & "Merry-Go-Round" Chi Coltrane - "Thunder and Lightning" & "You Were My Friend" Freemen and Murray (comedy team) Tom T. Hall - "The Year That Clayton Delaney Died" & "Old Dogs, Children and Watermelon" Andrew Johnson (comedian) Gladys Knight and the Pips - "If I Were Your Woman" & "Neither One of Us" Kenny Rankin - "You Are the Sunshine of My Life" & "In the Name of Love" The Raspberries - "I Wanna Be with You" & "Let's Pretend"	May 5, 1973
16	Burns and Schreiber	Jack Burns and Avery Schreiber (comedy team, guest hosts) Mark Almond - What Am I Loving For, Just Another Road Song & The City Kenny Colman - Last Tango in Paris The Crusaders - Put It Where You Want It & Don't Let It Get You Down Ronnie Dyson - One Man Band The Hollies - Long Cool Woman in a Black Dress The Incredible String Band - Black Jack Davy & Old Buccaneer Steve Martin (comedian, stand-up comedy segment) The O'Jays - Love Train	May 12, 1973
17	Chubby Checker		May 19, 1973
18	Gladys Knight & the Pips		May 26, 1973
19	Paul Williams		June 2, 1973
20	Curtis Mayfield		June 9, 1973
21	Jim Croce	Jim Croce - Operator, Roller Derby Queen, You Don't Mess With Jim, Speedball Tucker, Big Bad Leroy Brown, Careful Man Little Anthony and the Imperials - Dance To The Music, La La La At The End Savoy Brown - Tell Mama, Coming Down Your Way Bobby Womack - It's All Over Now, Nobody Wants You When You're Down And Out Shawn Phillips - Anello (Where Are You), America Barbara Fairchild - Teddy Bear Wishbone Ash - Jailbait	June 15, 1973
22	Bee Gees		June 23, 1973
23	Paul Williams		June 30, 1973
24	Jose Feliciano		July 7, 1973
25	Smokey Robinson		July 14, 1973
26	Joan Baez		July 21, 1973
27	Dionne Warwick		July 28, 1973
28	Al Green		August 4, 1973
29	Bee Gees		August 11, 1973
30	Richard Pryor		August 18, 1973
31	Loretta Lynn and Marty Robbins "Midnight Special Country Edition"	Loretta Lynn and Marty Robbins - "Midnight Special" Loretta Lynn - "One's on the Way" Marty Robbins - "Don't Worry" George Jones and Tammy Wynette - "We're Gonna Hold On" Tanya Tucker - "Blood Red and Goin' Down" The Earl Scruggs Revue - "Carolina Boogie" Tom T. Hall - "Spokane Motel Blues" Loretta Lynn and Marty Robbins - "Singing the Blues" Tammy Wynette - "Stand By Your Man" Charlie Rich - "Behind Closed Doors" Marty Robbins - "A White Sport Coat" / "Devil Woman" / "El Paso" Don Gibson - "Oh Lonesome Me" George Jones - "The Race Is On" Loretta Lynn - "Love Is the Foundation" Conway Twitty - "You've Never Been This Far Before" Loretta Lynn and Conway Twitty - "Louisiana Woman, Mississippi Man" Johnny Paycheck - "She's All I Got" Johnny Rodriguez - "Bossier City Backyard Blues" Tanya Tucker - "Delta Dawn" NOTE: Sammy Jackson fills in as announcer for Wolfman Jack.	August 25, 1973
32	Billy Preston		September 1, 1973
33	Mac Davis		September 8, 1973

== Season 2 (1973–1974) ==
Episode	Host	Performers	Original airdate
1	Curtis Mayfield		September 15, 1973
2	Wilson Pickett		September 22, 1973
3	Seals & Crofts	Seals & Crofts - "Diamond Girl" / "Dust On My Saddle" / "We May Never Pass This Way (Again)" / "Ruby Jean and Billie Lee" / "Pop Goes the Weasel"(instrumental); T. Rex "Hot Love" / "Bang a Gong (Get It On)"; Arlo Guthrie - "Gypsy Davy" / "Bling Blang"; Ramblin' Jack Elliot - "Talkin' Fishing Blues"; Uriah Heep - "Stealin'" / "Sweet Freedom"; Leo Kottke - "Bean Time"(instrumental); Paul Butterfield's Better Days - "New Walkin' Blues" / "Broke My Baby's Heart"	September 29, 1973
4	Gladys Knight & the Pips		October 6, 1973
5	The Bee Gees		October 13, 1973
6	War	War - "The Cisco Kid" / "Me and Baby Brother" / "The World Is a Ghetto" / "City Country City"; New York Dolls – "Trash" / "Personality Crisis"; Mott the Hoople - "All the Way from Memphis" / "Rose"; Danny O'Keefe - "Good Time Charlie's Got the Blues" / "Angel Spread Your Wings"; Climax Blues Band - "Shake Your Love" / "Constant"; Bachman-Turner Overdrive - "Hold Back the Water" / "Gimme Your Money Please"; Piper - "Bungle Rye"	October 20, 1973
7	Sly and the Family Stone		October 27, 1973
8	Chuck Berry		November 3, 1973
9	Jerry Lee Lewis	Jerry Lee Lewis - "Breathless" / "Hold On, I'm Comin'" / "Chantilly Lace" / "Lonely Weekends" / "Silver Threads Among the Gold" / "Whole Lotta Shakin' Goin' On"; Jerry Lee Lewis and Linda Gail Lewis - "Jackson"; Ballin' Jack - "This Song"; Dalton and Dubarri - "Any Other Man But Me" / "Take a Change"; Flash - "Dead Ahead" / "Psychosync"; B.B. King - "Hummingbird" / "Why I Sing the Blues"; Ike & Tina Turner - "River Deep Mountain High" / "Nutbush City Limits"	November 10, 1973
10	The 1980 Floor Show starring David Bowie		November 17, 1973
11	Peter Noone	Recorded on location in London: Gilbert O'Sullivan - "Ooh Baby" / "Get Down"; The Bee Gees - "Bad Bad Dreams" / "Don't Wanna Be the One"; Peter Noone and Herman's Hermits - "No Milk Today" / "There's a Kind of Hush"; Electric Light Orchestra - "Showdown" / "Ma-Ma-Ma Belle"; Gilbert O'Sullivan - "Who Knows Perhaps Maybe"; Peter Noone - "Last Blues Song"; David Essex - "Rock On"; Manfred Mann's Earth Band - "Joy Bringer"; Robin Trower - "Lady Love"; Robin Trower - "Man of the World"; David Essex - "Lamplight"; Manfred Mann's Earth Band - "In the Beginning"; Peter Noone - "Getting Over You" / "Oh You Pretty Thing"	November 24, 1973
12	Procol Harum	Recorded on location in London Procol Harum – "Conquistador" / "Whiter Shade of Pale" / "Grand Hotel" / "Fires Which Burn Brightly" / "Drunk Again" / " T.V. Caesar"; Humble Pie with The Blackberries - "Oh La De Da" / "I Don't Need No Doctor" / "30 Days in the Hole"; Alvin Lee and Mylon LeFevre - "Rockin' Till the Sun Goes Down" / "Carry My Load" / "The World Is Changing"; Steeleye Span - "Cam Ye O-er Frae France"	December 1, 1973
13	The Four Tops		December 8, 1973
14	Loggins & Messina		December 15, 1973
15	Jose Feliciano		December 22, 1973
16	Marty Robbins		December 29, 1973
17	Wolfman Jack "Million Sellers"	Clip show: Loggins and Messina - "Your Mama Don't Dance" (from Season 2, Episode 14); Billy Preston - "Will It Go Round in Circles" (from Season 1, Episode 32); Stories - "Brother Louie" (from Season 1, Episode 23); Gladys Knight & the Pips - “Midnight Train to Georgia” (from Season 2, Episode 4); Edgar Winter Group - "Frankenstein" (from Season 1, Episode 33); Spinners - "Could It Be I'm Falling in Love" (from Season 1, Episode 3); Curtis Mayfield - "Superfly" (from Season 1, Episode 20); Eric Weissberg and Deliverance - "Dueling Banjos" (from Season 1, Episode 9); Jim Croce - "Bad Bad Leroy Brown" (from Season 1, Episode 21); Dr. Hook and the Medicine Show - "The Cover of the Rolling Stone" (from Season 2, Episode 13); Gilbert O'Sullivan - "Get Down" (from Season 2, Episode 11); Al Green - "Call Me" (from Season 1, Episode 28); Charlie Rich - “Behind Closed Doors” (from Season 2, Episode 16); The O'Jays - "Love Train" (from Season 1, Episode 9); Dobie Gray - “Drift Away” (from Season 1, Episode 13); Edward Bear - "Last Song" (from Season 1, Episode 7)	January 5, 1974
18	Dr. Hook & the Medicine Show		January 12, 1974
19	Smokey Robinson		January 19, 1974
20	Steve Miller		January 26, 1974
21	Helen Reddy	Helen Reddy - "Leave Me Alone" / "Delta Dawn" / "Don't Mess with a Woman" / "Time" & "I Am Woman"; Franklin Ajaye - "Spot"; The Impressions - "Preacher Man"; Curtis Mayfield - "If I Were a Child Again"; Kenny Rankin - "Why Do Fools Fall in Love" / "Haven't We Met"; Rare Earth - "Big John Is My Name" / "Born to Wander" / "Don't Fight It"; Ike & Tina Turner - "Land of 1000 Dances" / "It's Gonna Work Out Fine"	February 2, 1974
22	Ike & Tina Turner	Ike & Tina Turner - "City Girl, Country Boy" / "With a Little Help from My Friends" / "Proud Mary" / "I Smell Trouble"; Electric Light Orchestra - "Showdown" / "Bluebird Is Dead"; David Essex - "Rock On" / "Streetfight"; Jose Feliciano - "I Like What You Give" / "Blame It On the Sun"; Flash Cadillac & the Continental Kids - "Dancin' on a Saturday Night" & "Muleskinner Blues"; Mandrill - "Git It All"; Todd Rundgren - "Couldn't I Just Tell You" / "A Dream Goes On Forever"	February 9, 1974
23	Roy Orbison		February 16, 1974
24	Gordon Lightfoot	Gordon Lightfoot - "The List" / "If You Could Read My Mind" / "Don Quixote" / "Affair on Eighth Avenue" / "High and Dry" / "Sundown" James Gang - "Standing in the Rain" / "The Devil is Singing Our Song" The Guess Who - "Share the Land" / "Star Baby" Redbone - "Come and Get Your Love" / "Maggie" Maria Muldaur - "Midnight at the Oasis" / "Don't You Feel My Leg" Ravi Shankar - "Raga Jogiya" Byron MacGregor - "The Americans"	February 22, 1974
25	Dr. Hook & the Medicine Show		March 2, 1974
26	Gladys Knight & the Pips		March 9, 1974
27	The Pointer Sisters		March 16, 1974
28	Bill Withers		March 23, 1974
29	The Guess Who		March 30, 1974
30	The Righteous Brothers		April 6, 1974
31	Roy Clark		April 13, 1974
32	Curtis Mayfield		April 20, 1974
33	Charlie Rich		April 27, 1974
34	The Spinners		May 4, 1974
35	George Carlin		May 11, 1974
36	Frankie Avalon	An all-oldies episode: Frankie Avalon - "Venus" / "Why" / "Gingerbread" / "Just Ask Your Heart" / "Bobby Sox to Stockings"; Sam and Dave - "Hold On, I'm Comin'" / "Soul Man"; The Fleetwoods - "Come Softly to Me"; Jimmie F. Rodgers - "Kisses Sweeter than Wine" / "Honeycomb" / "Oh-Oh, I'm Falling in Love Again"; Frankie Ford - "Sea Cruise"; Fabian - "Rock Around the Clock" / "Turn Me Loose" / "Tiger"; Shirley and Lee - "Let the Good Times Roll"; Lou Christie - "Lightnin' Strikes" / "The Gypsy Cried"; The Royal Teens - "Short Shorts"; "The Great Midnight Special Rock and Roll Opera" (comedy sketch); Notes: Ludie Washington filled in for Leonard Lee as the "Lee" in Shirley and Lee for their performance. The Royal Teens, who had broken up in the early 1960s, reunited without keyboardist Bob Gaudio, who had withdrawn from all live performing in 1971; the remaining Teens performed to a backing track.	May 18, 1974
37	Richard Pryor		May 25, 1974
38	Marty Robbins		June 1, 1974
39	The Kinks	The Kinks - "You Really Got Me" / "Money Talks" / "Here Comes Yet Another Day" / "Celluloid Heroes" / "Skin and Bone"; Electric Light Orchestra - "Showdown" / "Bluebird Is Dead"; Rory Gallagher - "Hands Off" / "Who's That Comin'"; Buddy Miles - "Life Is What You Make It"; Alan Price - "In Times Like These" / "Between Today and Yesterday"; Suzi Quatro - "All Shook Up" / "Glycerine Queen"	June 8, 1974
40	David Steinberg "Midnight Comedy Special"	An all-comedy episode featuring stand-ups and routines from Steinberg and: Flip Wilson; Monty Python - "Kids Korner" / "Silly Olympics" film / "Nudge Nudge" (repeat from Season 2, Episode 5); Kentucky Fried Theater; Freddie Prinze Sr.; Ace Trucking Company; Franklin Ajaye	June 29, 1974
41	Anne Murray	Golden Earring, Country Joe McDonald, Rufus, Buffy Sainte-Marie, Eddie Kendricks	July 6, 1974
42	Bobby Womack		July 13, 1974
43	Helen Reddy		July 19, 1974
44	Leon Russell		July 27, 1974
45	Leon Russell	Recorded on location at Willie Nelson's 4th of July Picnic: Leon Russell - "Jambalaya" / "Goodnight, Irene"; Bobby Bare - "Marie Lavaux"; David Carradine - "A Country Mile"; John Hartford - "Turn Your Radio On"; Waylon Jennings - "Pick Up the Tempo" / "Willie the Wandering Gypsy and Me" / "Can You Save Her"; Doug Kershaw - "Louisiana Man" / "Cajun Joe"; Michael Murphy - "The South Canadian River Song"; Rick Nelson - "Someone to Love" / "Garden Party"; Willie Nelson - "Stay All Night a Little Longer"	August 3, 1974
46	Sly & the Family Stone		August 10, 1974
47	Little Richard		August 17, 1974
48	B.B. King "Midnight Blues Special"		August 31, 1974
49	Marvin Gaye	Filmed on location in Atlanta, GA	September 7, 1974
50	The O'Jays		September 14, 1974

== Season 3 (1974–1975) ==
Episode	Host	Performers	Original Air Date
1	Randy Newman	Randy Newman (host) - "Mama Told Me Not to Come," "Simon Smith and the Amazing Dancing Bear," "Political Science," "Davy and the Fat Boy," "I Think It's Going to Rain Today," "Rolling," "All His Love" & "Louisiana 1927" Ry Cooder - "Ditty Wah Ditty" Dr. John - "Let's Make a Better World," "Desitively Bonnaroo," "Mos' Scocious" & "Mama Don't Allow" Dr. John and Maria Muldaur - "Three Dollar Bill" Maria Muldaur - "Sweetheart," Lover Man" & "Squeeze Me" The Turtles - "Happy Together," "Feel Older Now," "Let Me Make Love to You" & "You Showed Me"	September 27, 1974
2	Al Green	Al Green (host) - "Sweet Talk," "Tired of Being Alone," "Sha La La," "Here I Am (Come and Take Me)," "I'm Still in Love with You" & "Love and Happiness." Al Green - medley: "Funny How Time Slips Away," "How Can You Mend a Broken Heart," "For the Good Times" and "Let's Stay Together" Joe Cocker - "Something" & "Delta Lady"	October 4, 1974
3	Jose Feliciano	Jose Feliciano (host) - "My Sweet Lord," "Chico and the Man," "T.S.O.P.," "Golden Lady" & "Love's Theme" Jesse Colin - "Morning Sun" & "Light Shine" Hot Tuna - "Hamar Promenade," "Day to Day Out the Window Blues" & "I See the Light" The Main Ingredient - "Everybody Plays the Fool," "Happiness Is Just Around the Bend" & "Just Don't Want to Be Lonely" Buffy Sainte-Marie - "I Can't Take It No More" & "That's the Way You Fall in Love"	October 11, 1974
4	Paul Anka "Midnight Top 40 Special"	Paul Anka - "You're Having My Baby," "Jubilation," "It Doesn't Matter Anymore," "American Pie" & "Let Me Get to Know You" Odia Coates and Paul Anka - "One Man Woman" James Brown - "Papa Don't Take No Mess" & "Good Foot" Brownsville Station - "Kings of the Party" The Guess Who with Wolfman Jack - "Clap for the Wolfman" The Guess Who - "American Woman" Ohio Players - "Skin Tight" The Tymes - "You Little Trustmaker"	October 18, 1974
5	David Steinberg	David Steinberg (host) Burns and Schreiber (comedy team of Jack Burns and Avery Schreiber) The Committee (comedy troupe) Steve Martin Pat McCormick (comedian) Monty Python's Flying Circus (clip from TV show) Freddie Prinze (comedian)	October 25, 1974
6	Fats Domino	Fats Domino (host) - "I'm in Love Again," "Blueberry Hill," "Ain't That a Shame?" "Josephine," "Walkin' to New Orleans," "I'm Gonna Be a Wheel Someday," "Blue Monday," "I Want to Walk You Home" & "When the Saints Go Marching In" The Coasters - "Yakety Yak," "Poison Ivy" & "Charlie Brown" Frankie Valli and the Four Seasons - "Dawn," "Let's Hang On," "Can't Take My Eyes Off of You," "Sherry," "Walk Like a Man," "Big Girls Don't Cry," "Bye Bye Baby," "Stay," "My Eyes Adored You," "Will You Still Love Me Tomorrow?" & "Rag Doll"	November 1, 1974
7	Redd Foxx	Golden Earring - "Big Tree Blue Sea," "Candy's Going Bad," "She Flies on Strange Wings" & "Love Is a Rodeo" Little Anthony and the Imperials - "What Is Hip?" "Goin' Out of My Head," "Hurts So Bad," "I Don't Have to Worry" & "The Loneliest House on the Block" Orphan - "I've Been Working"	November 8, 1974
8	Barry White	Barry White (host) - "You're the First, the Last, My Everything," "Can't Get Enough of Your Love, Babe," "Never Gonna Give You Up," "I'm Gonna Love You Just a Little More Baby" & "I Found Someone" The Eric Burdon Band - "It's My Life," "The Real Me" & "When I Was Young" Love Unlimited Orchestra - "Love's Theme," "Barry's Theme," "I Belong to You," "Oh Love We Finally Made It" & "Love Train"	November 15, 1974
9	George Carlin	George Carlin (host) The Kiki Dee Band - "I've Got the Music in Me" Roger McGuinn - "Peace on You" & "Better Change" Sparks - "Takent Is an Asset," "This Town Ain't Big Enough for Both of Us," "Amateur Hour" & "Here In Heaven" Roy Wood's Wizzard - "Brand New '88" & "Ball Park Incident"	November 22, 1974
10	Bobby Vinton	Bobby Vinton (host) - "My Melody of Love" "I Honestly Love You" & "Mr. Lonely" Carl Carlton - "Everlasting Love" Al Green - "Sha La La," "I'm Still in Love with You" & "Let's Stay Together" Rufus (featuring Chaka Khan) - "Tell Me Something Good" & "You Got the Love" Neil Sedaka - "Laughter in the Rain" & "Standing on the Inside" Billy Swan - "I Can Help"	November 29, 1974
11	Tom Jones	Tom Jones (host) - "My Soul Is a Witness," "Greenwood, Mississippi," "I Guess You Know Me Girl," "Pledging My Love," medley, "It Never Hurts to Be Nice to Somebody," "Danny Boy," "One Night with You," "Right Place, Wrong Time" & "Pledging My Love" Paul Anka and Tom Jones - "My Way" & "She's a Lady" Chuck Berry - "Johnny B. Goode" Chuck Berry and Tom Jones - "School Days," "Memphis" & "Roll Over Beethoven" The Kiki Dee Band - "I've Got the Music in Me"	December 6, 1974
12	Wolfman Jack	Million Sellers (Part 1) Paul Anka - "You're Having My Baby" Blue Magic - "Sideshow" James Brown - "The Payback" Gordon Lightfoot - "Sundown" Love Unlimited Orchestra - "Love's Theme" Olivia Newton-John - "If You Love Me Let Me Know" Steve Miller - "The Joker" Redbone - "Come and Get Your Love" Rufus, featuring Chaka Khan - "Tell Me Something Good" The Stylistics - "You Make Me Feel Brand New" Barry White - "Can't Get Enough of Your Love, Babe" & "Never Gonna Give You Up" Bobby Womack - "Looking for Love"	December 13, 1974
13	Wolfman Jack	Million Sellers (Part 2) Brownsville Station - "Smokin' in the Boys Room" David Essex - "Rock On" Marvin Hamlisch - "The Way We Were" & "The Entertainer" Gladys Knight & the Pips - "I've Got to Use My Imagination" & "Best Thing That Ever Happened to Me" Kool and the Gang - "Hollywood Swinging" & "Jungle Boogie" The Main Ingredient - "I Just Don't Want to Be Lonely" Byron McGregor - "The Americans" Olivia Newton-John - "Let Me Be There" The O'Jays - "For the Love of Money" Ohio Players - "Skin Tight"	December 20, 1974
14	Charley Pride	Filmed on location at the Tulsa State Fair. An all-country episode: Charley Pride (guest host) - "Is Anybody Goin' to San Antone?" "Kiss an Angel Good Morning," "Mississippi Cotton Picking Delta Town," "Cotton Fields," "All I Have to Offer You Is Me," "Kawliga," "It's Gonna Take a Little Bit Longer," "Louisiana Man," "Let Me Live" & "The Fugitive"; The Four Guys - "Too Late to Turn Back Now"; Doug Kershaw - "Diggy Diggy Lo," "Battle of New Orleans," "All I Want to Do Is Make Babies" & "Whatcha Gonna Do When You Can't"; Ronnie Milsap - "Rolling in My Sweet Baby's Arms," "Pure Love" and a medley of rock songs.; Gary Stewart - "Drinking Thing"	December 27, 1974
15	The Guess Who	The Guess Who and Wolfman Jack - "Clap for the Wolfman" The Guess Who - "Dancin' Fool," "Bus Rider," "Sour Suite," "No Time," "Diggin' Yourself" and "Dirty" Charlie Daniels - "Way Down Yonder" & "I've Been Down" Montrose - "I Got the Fire" & "Space Station #5" The Spencer Davis Group - "Gimme Some Lovin'," "Workin' on the Railread" & "Don't Throw Your Change on Me" Note: Average White Band had originally been scheduled for this episode but were unable to appear, with Montrose appearing in their stead. The Average White Band would appear on the February 7 episode.	January 3, 1975
16	The Righteous Brothers "The Midnight Top 40 Special"	The Righteous Brothers - "Dream On" / "Rock and Roll Heaven" / "Give It to the People"; The Guess Who - "Dancin' Fool" (encore from the previous episode); George Foreman (cameo); Frankie Valli - "My Eyes Adored You" (with The Four Seasons); Paul Anka and Odia Coates - "One Man Woman/One Woman Man" (encore from October 18, 1974); Gloria Gaynor - "Never Can Say Goodbye"; Bobby Hatfield - "You Turn Me Around"; Bill Medley - "Brown Eyed Woman"; Carol Douglas - "Doctor's Orders" / "Baby Don't Let This Good Love Die"; Billy "Crash" Craddock - "Ruby Baby"; The Four Seasons - "Sherry" / "Walk Like a Man" / "Big Girls Don't Cry" / "Bye, Bye, Baby (Baby, Goodbye)"; Note: The Four Seasons segments were recorded along with the episode two weeks prior at the Tulsa State Fair.	January 10, 1975
17	Electric Light Orchestra	The Ohio Players; Linda Ronstadt; Rufus featuring Chaka Khan	January 17, 1975
18	Marshall Tucker Band		January 24, 1975
19	Helen Reddy Second Anniversary Special		January 31, 1975
20	Dave Mason	Dave Mason; Average White Band; The Crusaders; Kiki Dee Band	February 7, 1975
21	3-in-1 Show	A trial format in which the time slot is split into three separate half-hour episodes dedicated to a single performer.: 1. Hosted by Neil Sedaka "That's When the Music Takes Me,” “The Immigrant,” “Laughter in the Rain,” “Standing on the Inside” & “Don't Let It Mess Your Mind”; 2. Hosted by the Detroit Spinners; The Detroit Spinners - “Then Came You,” 'I've Got to Make It on My Own,” “Living a Little, Laughing a Little” & “Sadie”; Sister Sledge - “Love Don't You Go Through No Changes on Me”; 3. Todd Rundgren with Utopia “Real Man,” “Freedom Fighter,” “Seven Rays,” “Born to Synthesize” & “Do Ya”	February 14, 1975
22	Steppenwolf	Steppenwolf; The Blackberries; The Headhunters; Herbie Hancock; Linda Ronstadt; Premiata Forneria Marconi	February 21, 1975
23	B. T. Express	B. T. Express; Sha Na Na; Jimmy Witherspoon; Sugarloaf; Peter Allen	February 28, 1975
24	Olivia Newton-John	Olivia Newton-John; Ike & Tina Turner; Leo Sayer; Waylon Jennings; Kenny Rankin	March 7, 1975
25	Clive Davis	Much of the program is devoted to an interview and retrospective conducted by Mac Davis paying tribute to Clive Davis from many of the artists whom Clive Davis had signed.: Ringo Starr; Harry Nilsson; Barry Manilow; Blood, Sweat & Tears; Loggins & Messina; Melissa Manchester; Gil Scott-Heron; Martha Reeves; Janis Joplin (archival footage from 1969)	March 14, 1975
26	Black Oak Arkansas	Black Oak Arkansas; Ruby Starr and Grey Ghost; Montrose; Alvin Lee & Co.	March 21, 1975
27	Wolfman Jack "The Midnight International Special"	Compilation episode featuring acts from outside the United States: (Netherlands) Golden Earring; (Canada) The Guess Who; (United Kingdom) Electric Light Orchestra; (Italy) Premiata Forneria Marconi; (Republic of Ireland) Rory Gallagher; (India) Ravi Shankar; (Australia) Brian Cadd	March 28, 1975
28	The Ohio Players	Recorded on location at an Ohio Players concert on the campus of the University of Chicago	April 4, 1975
29	Charlie Daniels; Wet Willie	Recorded on location at the University of Chicago.: Wet Willie; Bonnie Bramlett; Recorded on location in Mount Juliet, Tennessee: Charlie Daniels Band; John Mayall; B. J. Thomas	April 11, 1975
30	Earth, Wind & Fire	Earth, Wind & Fire; LaBelle; Melissa Manchester; Leo Sayer	April 18, 1975
31	Rod Stewart	Recorded on location at a Faces concert in London: Faces; Keith Richards	April 25, 1975
32	Billy Preston	Billy Preston and His All-Star Band featuring Jeff Beck and Buddy Miles; LaBelle; Rufus featuring Chaka Khan	May 2, 1975
33	Wolfman Jack	Additional performances from the University of Chicago.: Ohio Players; Roxy Music; Graham Central Station; The Strawbs; Larry Gatlin	May 9, 1975
34	Chubby Checker A Musical Salute to the 50s and 60s	Chubby Checker; The Angels; Lesley Gore; Bo Diddley; Danny and the Juniors; The Drifters; The Tymes	May 16, 1975
35	Don Cornelius The Midnight Disco Special	Harold Melvin and the Blue Notes; Earth, Wind & Fire; Disco-Tex and the Sex-O-Lettes; Consumer Rapport; The Whispers; Herbie Mann; The Lockers; Soul Train Dancers	May 23, 1975
36	Joan Baez	Hoyt Axton; Hampton Hawes; Kool and the Gang	May 30, 1975
37	Barry Manilow, Jim Seals and Dash Crofts	Seals & Crofts; Barry Manilow; Ben E. King; Ron Dante; Olivia Newton-John	June 13, 1975
38	Herb Alpert	Herb Alpert and the Tijuana Brass; Billy Preston; Phoebe Snow; Supertramp; Captain and Tennille; This episode also saw the introduction of "Rock Rap" gossip segments hosted by Carol Wayne, who had recently married producer Burt Sugarman.	June 20, 1975
39	The Temptations	The Temptations; Ace; Jessi Colter; Rose; Leo Sayer.	June 27, 1975

- Aerosmith - "Train Kept A-Rollin'" and "Dream On"
- Ann Peebles
- Barry White - "Can't Get Enough of Your Love, Babe" and "Never, Never Gonna Give You Up"
- Billy Joel
- Bill Withers - "Ain't No Sunshine"
- Bonnie Tyler - "It's a Heartache" (This must be an error—song was not released until 1977)
- Brownsville Station - "Smokin' in the Boys Room"
- Charlie Rich - "Behind Closed Doors"
- Curtis Mayfield - "Superfly"
- David Brenner
- David Essex - "Rock On"
- Dobie Gray - "Drift Away"
- Eddie Kendricks - "Keep On Truckin'"
- Edgar Winter Group - "Frankenstein"
- Edwin Starr
- El Chicano
- Freddie Prinze
- Genesis
- Gladys Knight & B.B. King - "The Thrill is Gone"
- Gladys Knight & the Pips - "Best Thing That Ever Happened To Me"
- Golden Earring - "Radar Love"
- Gordon Lightfoot - "Sundown" and "If You Could Read My Mind"
- The Guess Who - "American Woman" and"Undun"
- Hot Tuna - "Hamar Promenade", "Day to Day Out the Window Blues" and "I See the Light"
- Humble Pie - "Oh La-De-Da" and "30 Days in the Hole"
- Ike & Tina Turner - "Proud Mary"
- James Brown - "The Payback"
- Jo Jo Gunne
- Jobriath - "I'maman" and "Rock of Ages"
- Kool And The Gang - "Hollywood Swinging and Jungle Boogie"
- Leo Sayer
- Little Richard
- Loggins and Messina- "Your Mama Don't Dance"
- Lynn Anderson
- The Main Ingredient - "Just Don't Want To Be Lonely"
- Maria Muldaur - "Midnight at the Oasis"
- Marvin Gaye - "Let's Get It On and What's Going On"
- Montrose - "Paper Money" and "I Got the Fire"
- Neil Sedaka - "Laughter in the Rain"
- The New York Dolls
- The O'Jays - "Love Train"
- Ohio Players - "Skin Tight"
- Olivia Newton-John - "If You Love Me (Let Me Know)"
- The Spinners
- Phil Ochs and Jim Glover - "The Power and the Glory" and "Changes"
- Redbone - "Come and Get Your Love"
- Rufus Featuring Chaka Khan - "Tell Me Something Good"
- Shirley & Lee - "Let the Good Times Roll"
- Sly & the Family Stone - "Everybody is a Star" and "Thank You (Falletin Me be Mice-Elf Again)"
- Stories - "Brother Louie"
- The Stylistics - "You Make Me Feel Brand New"
- Todd Rundgren - "Couldn't I Just Tell You?" & "A Dream Goes On Forever"
- War - "Cisco Kid"

== 1975 ==
- ABBA - "SOS" and "I Do, I Do, I Do, I Do, I Do"
- Aretha Franklin and Ray Charles - "It Takes Two to Tango"
- Barry Manilow - "Mandy" and "Could It Be Magic?"
- The Bee Gees - "Nights on Broadway", "Jive Talkin'" and "To Love Somebody" (Duet With Helen Reddy)
- Captain & Tennille - "Love Will Keep Us Together (Duet With Neil Sedaka)"
- David Steinberg
- Dolly Parton
- Earth Wind and Fire - "Shining Star"
- Electric Light Orchestra (guest hosts) - "In the Hall of the Mountain King", "Great Balls of Fire", "Can't Get It Out of My Head", "Orange Blossom Special", "Laredo Tornado", "Flight of the Bumble Bee" & "Roll Over Beethoven"
- Frankie Valli (Guest Host) - "Can't Take My Eyes Off You"
- Glen Campbell - "Rhinestone Cowboy"
- Helen Reddy - "I Am Woman", "Delta Dawn" and "Angie Baby"
- The Hollies - "Long Cool Woman (In A Black Dress)"
- Jack Burns & Avery Schreiber
- KC and the Sunshine Band - "That's the Way (I Like It)"
- KISS - "Black Diamond", "Deuce", & "She"
- Kraftwerk - "Autobahn" (S03E43 July 25, 1975)
- Labelle - "Lady Marmalade", “What Can I Do for You?”
- Leo Sayer
- Linda Ronstadt
- Minnie Riperton - "Lovin' You"
- Natalie Cole - "This Will Be (An Everlasting Love)"
- Neil Sedaka - "Bad Blood", "Breaking Up Is Hard to Do"
- Ohio Players - "Love Rollercoaster"
- Olivia Newton-John - "Have You Never Been Mellow"
- Orleans - "Dance with Me"
- Peter Frampton - "Show Me the Way", "Do You Feel Like We Do", "Baby, I Love Your Way"
- PFM - "Celebration" and "Alta Loma Nine Till Five"'
- Rod Stewart - "You Wear It Well"
- Roxy Music - "Out Of The Blue", "The Thrill Of It All", "A Really Good Time" (aired 05/09/1975)
- Todd Rundgren - "Real Man", "Freedom Fighters" & "Seven Rays"
- The Whitney Family

== 1976 ==
- Aretha Franklin - "Respect", "Something He Can Feel"
- Bill Haley & His Comets "Rock Around the Clock", "See You Later Alligator" (archive footage from the movie Rock Around the Clock)
- Diana Ross - "Love Hangover"
- Donna Summer - "Love to Love You Baby"
- Electric Light Orchestra - "Evil Woman", "Nightrider" & "Strange Magic"
- Elton John - "Your Song"
- Electric Light Orchestra - "Evil Woman", "Can't Get It Out of My Head" and "Strange Magic"
- England Dan and John Ford Coley - "I'd Really Love to See You Tonight"
- Eric Carmen - "All By Myself"
- Fleetwood Mac - "Over My Head", "Rhiannon", "World Turning", "Why"
- Gary Wright - "Dream Weaver", "Love Is Alive"
- George Benson - "This Masquerade"
- Heart - "Magic Man", "Crazy On You", "Dreamboat Annie"
- Helen Reddy
- Hot Chocolate - "You Sexy Thing"
- Janis Ian - "At Seventeen"
- Joan Baez - "The Night They Drove Old Dixie Down"
- LaBelle - "Lady Marmalade"
- Lynn Anderson - "Stand By Your Man", "Don't Go Breaking My Heart" w/Tom Jones
- Minnie Riperton - "Lovin' You"
- The Miracles - "Love Machine"
- Michael Murphey - "Wildfire"
- Peter Frampton - "Show Me the Way"
- Ray Charles - "Georgia on My Mind"
- Spinners - "The Rubberband Man"
- Starbuck - "Moonlight Feels Right"
- Tom Jones - "Delilah, "Don't Go Breaking My Heart" w/Lynn Anderson
- Walter Murphy and The Big Apple Band - "A Fifth of Beethoven"
- Wild Cherry - "Play That Funky Music"

== 1977 ==
- Andrew Gold - "Lonely Boy"
- Andy Gibb - "I Just Want To Be Your Everything"
- Andy Kaufman - "I Trusted You"
- Bonnie Raitt - "Runaway"
- Bread (hosts) - "Make It With You"
- Dave Mason - "We Just Disagree"
- Eddie Rabbitt - "Rocky Mountain Music"
- Electric Light Orchestra (hosts) - "Rockaria!", "Livin' Thing", "Do Ya", "Telephone Line" & "Livin' Thing (reprise)"
- Emmylou Harris
- The Emotions - "Best Of My Love"
- Gino Vannelli - "Summers of My Life"
- James Brown - "Get Up Offa That Thing"
- Jennifer Warnes - "Right Time of the Night"
- Jesse Winchester -
- Johnny Rivers - "Slow Dancin'"
- Journey "Feeling That Way " "Anytime" "Wheel in the Sky"
- Leo Sayer - "You Make Me Feel Like Dancing"
- Little Feat - "Dixie Chicken"
- Lou Rawls - "You'll Never Find Another Love Like Mine"
- Manfred Mann's Earth Band - "Blinded by the Light"
- Marilyn McCoo & Billy Davis, Jr. - "You Don't Have To Be A Star (To Be In My Show)"
- Marvin Gaye - "What's Going On", "Got to Give It Up"
- Player
- Renaissance - "Midas Man" & "Carpet of the Sun"
- Sanford-Townsend Band - "Smoke from a Distant Fire"
- Thelma Houston - "Don't Leave Me This Way"
- Thin Lizzy - "Jailbreak (Thin Lizzy song)"
- Van Morrison - "Domino"
- Weather Report - "Birdland"

== 1978 ==
- AC/DC - "Sin City"
- Aerosmith - "Come Together"
- Ambrosia - "How Much I Feel"
- Andy Gibb - "I Just Want To Be Your Everything"
- Billy Preston "Nothing From Nothing"
- The Cars - "Just What I Needed"
- Cheap Trick - "Surrender"
- Chic - "Le Freak," "Everybody Dance"
- Chuck Mangione - "Feels So Good"
- Crystal Gayle - "Don't It Make My Brown Eyes Blue"
- Dan Hill - "Sometimes When We Touch"
- David Bowie
- Dolly Parton
- Donna Summer - "Last Dance", "I Feel Love", "Heaven Knows"
- Eddie Money - "Baby Hold On," "Two Tickets to Paradise"
- Electric Light Orchestra - "Telephone Line"
- The Emotions - "Best Of My Love"
- Evelyn Champagne King - "Shame", "I Don't Know If It's Right"
- Exile - "Kiss You All Over"
- Four Tops - "Ain't No Woman (Like The One I've Got)"
- George Benson
- Golden Earring - "Grab It for a Second", "Against the Grain"
- Hall & Oates - "Rich Girl"
- KC and the Sunshine Band
- Leo Sayer - "When I Need You"
- Nick Lowe- "So It Goes"
- Peaches & Herb
- Player
- REO Speedwagon - "Roll With The Changes"
- Rick James - "Mary Jane"
- Robert Palmer - "Every Kinda People"
- Ronnie Montrose - Town Without Pity & "My Little Mystery"
- Starland Vocal Band - "Afternoon Delight"
- Sylvester - "You Make Me Feel (Mighty Real)", "Dance (Disco Heat)", and "Grateful"
- Ted Nugent - "Cat Scratch Fever", "Need You Bad", "Free For All" (Hosted this Show)
- The O'Jays - "For The Love Of Money"
- Sammy Hagar - "You Make Me Crazy"
- Thin Lizzy - "The Cowboy Song", "Live From the Rainbow London"
- Todd Rundgren - "Can We Still Be Friends" & "Bread" (with the Hello People)
- Todd Rundgren's Utopia - (guest host) "Real Man", "You Cried Wolf", "Love in Action", "Sometimes I Don't Know What to Feel" & "Just One Victory"
- Tom Petty & The Heartbreakers - "American Girl", Listen To Her Heart and I Need to Know"
- The Trammps - "Disco Inferno"
- Village People
- Yvonne Elliman - "If I Can't Have You"

== 1979 ==
- Alice Cooper - "Medley: Eighteen/Only Women Bleed/Billion Dollar Babies," "Inmates (We're All Crazy)"
- Amii Stewart - "Knock on Wood"
- The Babys - "Everytime I Think of You"
- The Beach Boys - "Good Vibrations"
- Bonnie Pointer - "Heaven Must Have Sent You"
- Blondie - "One Way or Another," "Dreaming," "Heart of Glass"
- The Cars - "Let's Go," "Just What I Needed," "Dangerous Type, "My Best Friend's Girl"
- The Charlie Daniels Band - "The Devil Went Down to Georgia"
- The Commodores - "Three Times a Lady", "Brick House"
- Crystal Gayle - "Cry Me a River"
- Dan Hartman - "Instant Replay"
- Dolly Parton - "I Will Always Love You"
- Gloria Gaynor - "I Will Survive," "Never Can Say Good-bye"
- Grace Jones - "Below the Belt", "Do or Die"
- Journey - "Lovin', Touchin', Squeezin'," "Wheel in the Sky," "City of The Angels"
- KC and the Sunshine Band
- Minnie Riperton - "Lovin' You" (memorial replay of her 1975 appearance)
- Nick Gilder - "Hot Child in the City"
- Peaches & Herb - "Reunited," "Shake Your Groove Thing"
- The Pointer Sisters - "Fire"
- Randy Jones
- Rick James - "You and I"
- Robert Fripp - "Frippertronics"
- Robert Palmer - "Bad Case Of Lovin' You (Doctor, Doctor)"
- Rupert Holmes - "Escape (The Piña Colada Song)"
- Suicide - "Dream Baby Dream"
- The Three Degrees - "Giving Up Giving In", The Runner"
- The Jacksons - "Shake Your Body Down To The Ground"
- Tina Turner
- Todd Rundgren
- Village People

== 1980 ==
- America - "Sister Golden Hair"
- Benny Mardones - "Into the Night"
- Billy Preston
- Christopher Cross
- David Bowie
- Eddie Rabbitt - "Drivin' My Life Away"
- Frankie Valli & Commodores - "Grease"
- Gladys Knight & the Pips
- Hall & Oates - "Kiss on My List"
- Isaac Hayes - "Don't Let Go"
- John Mellencamp - "This Time" & "Ain't Even Done With The Night"
- Leo Sayer
- Olivia Newton-John - "Magic", "Dancin'"
- Randy Jones
- REO Speedwagon - "Keep on Loving You"
- Roy Orbison - (Host, Season 8, Episode 25) "Oh, Pretty Woman", "Only the Lonely", "Crying", "Running Scared", "Hound Dog Man", "Blue Bayou" & "The Eyes of Texas"
- The Oak Ridge Boys - "Leaving Louisiana in the Broad Daylight"
- The Spinners
- Dr. Hook
- Prince - "I Wanna Be Your Lover" & "Why You Wanna Treat Me So Bad ?"

== 1981 ==
- 707 - "Tonite's Your Night"
- Andy Kaufman
- David Bowie
- Freddy Cannon - "Tallahassee Lassie"
- Slim Whitman - "I Remember You"
- The Spinners
- Tony Clifton
