= California, Here I Come =

1924 song by Bud DeSylva, Joseph Meyer and Al Jolson

- Sheet music, 1924

Song by Al Jolson with Isham Jones Orchestra
- Published: January 7, 1924 by M. Witmark & Sons, New York
- Released: 1924
- Recorded: January 17, 1924
- Genre: Pop standard
- Length: 2:26
- Label: Brunswick 2569
- Songwriters: Bud DeSylva, Joseph Meyer, Al Jolson

Audio sample
- Recording of California, Here I Come, performed by the Golden Gate Orchestra (1924): file; help

"California, Here I Come" is a song interpolated in the Broadway musical Bombo, starring Al Jolson. The song was written by Bud DeSylva, Joseph Meyer, and Jolson. Jolson recorded the song on January 17, 1924, with Isham Jones' Orchestra, in Brunswick Records' Chicago studio. It is often called the unofficial state song of California. In 2020, it entered the public domain. (Note: Under Title 17 of the US Code, copyrights expire 95 years after publication. For works from before 1964, a valid renewal was also required. With a valid renewal in its 95th year of publication, the copyright for this work did not expire until January 1, 2020. All copyrights expire at the end of their 95th year.)

== State song ==
Several attempts were made to designate "California, Here I Come" as the official state song of California, especially after a resolution passed by the California State Legislature in 1951 designated "I Love You, California" as the state song. However, those attempts proved unsuccessful, and "I Love You, California" was officially declared the state song in 1988.

== Covers ==
In 1924, Cliff Edwards ("Ukulele Ike") released a very upbeat single of the song, which included some scat vocals and a brief sung intro: "Goodbye forever, goodbye forever, I'm going away for a long, long time."

"Casa Loma Stomp," recorded by Fletcher Henderson, is a set of jazz variations on the song, the tune of which is clearly audible in the first few verses and gradually disappears under the increasing complexity of the variations.

Freddy Cannon recorded the song on his debut 1960 album The Explosive Freddy Cannon.

Ray Charles recorded a cover, which appears in his 1960 album The Genius Hits the Road.

The four future members of ABBA performed a Wild West-themed version of the song for their first joint television appearance in 1970, on the SVT program Five Minute Saloon.

In 1977, Tom Waits released Foreign Affairs, featuring a tribute to the song in a medley titled "Jack & Neal/California, Here I Come".

In 2010, Huell Howser teamed up musicians at the Musicians Institute and produced a cover and music video of "California, Here I Come."

== Other songs ==
The Dutch rock group Shocking Blue also had a song called "California Here I Come" on their first album At Home and on the North American version of that album, simply titled The Shocking Blue. The same version of this song was later released as "Hear My Song" on the B-side of the "Never Marry A Railroad Man" single on the Colossus label. Their song, despite having the same title, should not be confused with the song co-written by Al Jolson. While the song titles are exactly the same, they are completely different songs and neither is based on or references the other.

== In animation and television ==
The song, often as an instrumental version, was frequently used by Carl Stalling and Milt Franklyn, musical directors at Warner Bros. Cartoons. The song often accompanies a hasty or spontaneous departure, or a fast-moving train, such as in the 1937 cartoon Porky's Railroad, 1946's Hair-Raising Hare, 1950's Bushy Hare, and 1955's Rabbitson Crusoe, as examples.

The song is featured in the 1948 Paramount Screen Song, The Golden State.

A well-known rendition of the song appears in a season 4 episode of the television series I Love Lucy. The episode, titled "California, Here We Come!" (1955), features the four principal cast members beginning a cross-country road trip from New York City to California, where Ricky Ricardo (Desi Arnaz) plans to make a movie. Ricky, who is shown behind the wheel driving across the George Washington Bridge from New York into New Jersey (and westward), begins singing the song's chorus and he is soon joined by Fred (William Frawley) and Ethel (Vivian Vance), and then, finally, by a badly off-key but highly spirited Lucy (Lucille Ball). At one point, Fred sings part of the chorus as a short solo in a manner that is highly suggestive of the syncopated style often associated with Al Jolson, and Ricky joins in briefly with a similar apparent nod to the song's originator. Still images of the famous scene, which have been popularized in posters and greeting cards, are often used to typify the I Love Lucy series (all four principal cast members are shown together and facing the camera) and the scene offers a nostalgic view of America's love affair with the automobile in the 1950s.

The song is played during the closing credits of The Monkees' 1969 TV Special, 33⅓ Revolutions per Monkee, with band member Peter Tork on lead vocals.

The song appears in the final episode of Martin, entitled "California, Here We Come," on May 1, 1997, in which Martin and Gina say good-bye to the Motor City for jobs in Los Angeles.

Phantom Planet credits Al Jolson and the writers of "California, Here I Come" for Phantom Planet's song "California", which was used as the theme song to the television series The O.C.. The 2002 song, although not a complete cover, alludes to Jolson's song in its lines "California, here we come / Right back where we started from".

The song is used as the theme song for the California historical travelogue series on PBS, California's Gold, hosted by Huell Howser. On November 9, 2010, Howser released a music video of his performance of "California, Here I Come" on Los Angeles public-television station KCET.

== In film ==
In the 1934 W. C. Fields film It's a Gift, a record of the song is shown on-screen and the Victrola needle is put down to play it. The recording then plays over the next scene, showing the Bissonette family packing for their trip to the West Coast. Also in 1934, The Thin Man, ends with a short rendition of the song.

Al Jolson sings it in the musical film Rose of Washington Square (1939).

The song is featured as the main title theme of the 1945 motion picture Back to Bataan, starring John Wayne and Anthony Quinn. It was the Victory March of the US Sixth Army, which played a major role in the liberation of the Philippine Islands. The Sixth Army, formerly the Army of the Pacific, was based in California with its headquarters at the Presidio near San Francisco.

In the 1980 movie The Shining, while freezing and losing his verbal coherency in the hedge maze, some believe Jack Nicholson recites part of the song at one point.

In the 1981 Burt Reynolds and Dom DeLuise comedy The Cannonball Run, Doctor Nikolas Van Helsing (portrayed by Jack Elam) musses the chorus in the background during a discussion.

In what is arguably the most ironic appearance of the song in popular culture, in the 2003 Canadian film The Saddest Music in the World, the song is played by the American team in the final round of the competition (against Serbia), by a multicultural orchestra consisting of violins, sitar, and Romanian panpipes.

== Other cultural references ==
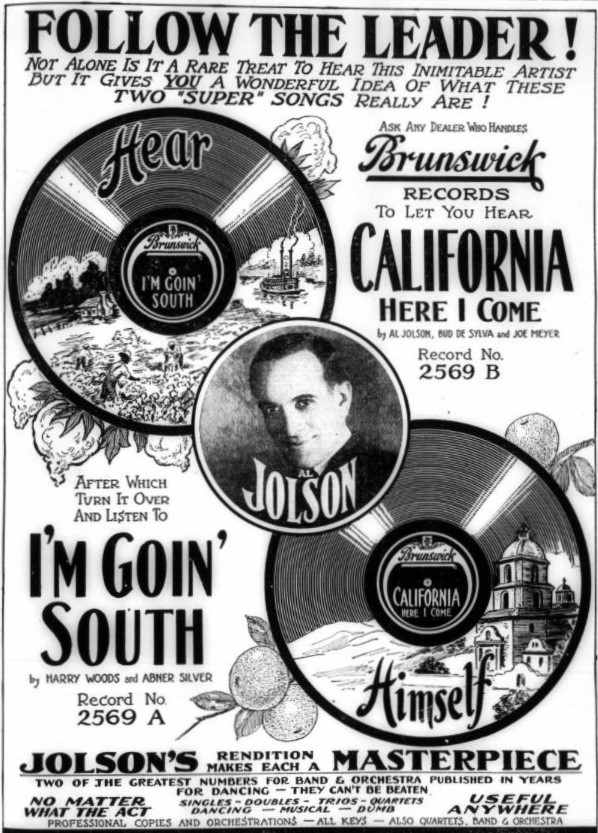
A 1924 advertisement for the song

The song was played by the ship's band of the aircraft carrier USS Yorktown (CV-5) as the ship steamed from Pearl Harbor to participate in the Battle of Midway. The song may have been intended as a deception, as the severely outnumbered American forces depended on surprise to gain an advantage in the battle. Japanese agents seeing the Yorktown departing would hopefully conclude that it was steaming for the mainland rather than to Midway.

The song is the theme song for California's Gold.

The song is played in the classic Sierra game Gold Rush! as the ship carrying fortune seekers comes to port in Sacramento.

Richard Nixon, in a set of instructions he left in case he were to die in office, directed that "California, Here I Come" should be played "softly and slowly" at his funeral. When President and Mrs. Ronald Reagan left Washington, D.C. in 1989 to return to Los Angeles, "California, Here I Come" was played as they boarded Air Force One.

The song was one of many California related songs played throughout "Sunshine Plaza" in the original Disney California Adventure.

The fight song of San Francisco State University, the "State Victory Song," is sung to the tune of "California, Here I Come."

The song was sung during the Pageant of the Masters' recreation of Maxine Albro's "California." The Pageant of the Masters makes "living recreations" of art in Laguna Beach every year.

The Coburg Football Club, who play in the Victorian Football League, use the tune of "California, Here I Come" in their song, "Coburg will be there".

The song is played at all University of California graduation ceremonies.

== See also ==
- Ronald Reagan in music
