= California's Gold =

American television program

- Also known as: California's Gold with Huell Howser
- Genre: Human interest
- Created by: Huell Howser
- Written by: Huell Howser
- Presented by: Huell Howser
- Opening theme: "California, Here I Come"
- Country of origin: United States
- Original language: English
- No. of seasons: 24
- No. of episodes: 443

Production
- Producers: Huell Howser; Phil Noyes; Harry Pallenberg
- Editors: David Swofford; Mary Danly
- Camera setup: Single camera
- Running time: 30–60 minutes
- Production companies: KCET; Huell Howser Productions

Original release
- Network: KCET
- Release: 1991 – 2012

California's Gold is a public television human interest program that explored the natural, cultural, and historical features of California. The series of half-hour long episodes ran for 24 seasons beginning in 1991, and was produced and hosted by Huell Howser in collaboration with KCET, Los Angeles. The series ceased production when Howser retired in November 2012, shortly before his death on January 7, 2013, although episodes continue to be shown on KCET and are featured on the page at the station's website about his shows.

The series theme song is "California, Here I Come". Typically, it is performed by local musicians who may be from a given episode's locale. However, some episodes include an old-time recording of the California state song "I Love You, California".

== Production ==
The minimal production allowed locations and people to remain the focal point of the program. Howser's archives are now housed at Chapman University in Orange, California, and can be streamed online. The decision to donate them grew out of his experiences making an episode of the show.

== Episodes ==
California's Gold is divided into 24 seasons of varying lengths (plus specials), comprising 443 episodes.

In May 2016, KCET showed a "lost" episode on the Charles F. Lummis House, now considered to be the final episode. In March 2018, documentary filmmaker John McDonald released an unofficial episode of the series. "California's Gold: The Ghost Mountain Experiment" documents the life of California hermit Marshal South and family, and incorporates previously unreleased footage produced by Howser.

== Related shows ==
Several related shows were also produced by Huell Howser Productions in collaboration with KCET. These were:

- California's Green, a show about environmentally friendly measures in California
- California's Golden Coast
- California's Golden Parks
- California's Water
- California's Missions
- Road Trip, a show about sights along California's highways and byways
- Downtown, a show about Los Angeles' downtown
- Visiting...: a show about sights in the Los Angeles area
- Palm Springs
