= List of songs about the San Francisco Bay Area =

This is a list of songs about San Francisco Bay Area, California: either refer to, are set there, named after a location or feature of the city, named after a famous resident, or inspired by an event that occurred locally. In addition, several core cities in the San Francisco Bay Area such as San Francisco, San Jose, and Oakland are also included in this list despite being separate cities. The songs listed are those that are notable or are by notable artists.

== #s–R ==
=== #s–A ===
- "27th Ave. Shuffle" by Foxboro Hot Tubs
- "707" by Mac Dre
- "99 Miles to San Francisco" by April Matson
- "All Dressed Up for San Francisco" by The Philosopher Kings
- "All the Lost Souls Welcome You to San Francisco" by American Music Club
- "Arizona" by Mark Lindsay
- "Autumn" by Joanna Newsom

=== B–D ===
- "Babylon Sisters" by Steely Dan
- "Back in San Francisco" by The Orange Peels
- "Back to Sausalito" by Rod McKuen
- "Back to Sausalito" by Bobby Russell
- "The Ballad of San Francisco" by Caedmon's Call
- "The Ballad of Wilhelm Fink" by Green Day
- "Battery" by Metallica
- "The Bay" by Lyrics Born
- "The Bay" by Zion I
- "Berkeley Pier" by Tilt
- "The Best in Me" by Sherwood
- "Bixby Canyon Bridge" by Death Cab for Cutie
- "Blame It on the Boogie" by The Jacksons
- "The Blind Leaving the Blind" by Punch Brothers
- "Caldecott Tunnel" by Something Corporate
- "California On My Mind" by Wild Light
- "Calling San Francisco" by Tommy Castro
- "Campbell California" by Lars Frederiksen and the Bastards
- "Carlotta Valdez" by Harvey Danger
- "The Chapter in Your Life Entitled San Francisco" by The Lucksmiths
- "Christie Road" by Green Day
- "Christmas in San Francisco" by Vic Damone
- "City Hall" by Vienna Teng
- "Cold Wind" by Arcade Fire
- "Come Back from San Francisco" by The Magnetic Fields
- "Come Monday" by Jimmy Buffett
- "Condition Oakland" by Jawbreaker
- "Count Your Bruises" by The Flatliners
- "Daly City Train" by Rancid
- "Danville Girl" by Woody Guthrie
- "Deep Kick" by Red Hot Chili Peppers
- "Desvelado" by Bobby Pulido
- "Do You Know the Way to San Jose" by Burt Bacharach, performed by Dionne Warwick, Neil Diamond, Frankie Goes to Hollywood
- "Don't Gimme No Bammer Weed" by RBL Posse
- "Don't Marry Her" by The Beautiful South
- "Down in Oakland" by Transplants
- "Down in Frisco" by Jon English
- "Down on Mission Street" by Lloyd Cole
- "Drop the Weapon" by Deep Purple
- "Drunk in San Francisco" by San Quinn & Tuf Luv

=== E–G ===
- "Earthquake Weather" by All Bets Off
- "East Bay Night" by Rancid
- "El Cerrito" by Cracker
- "Fake Tales of San Francisco" by Arctic Monkeys
- "Frisco Blues" by John Lee Hooker
- "Frisco Depot" by Mickey Newbury
- "Frisco Town" by Memphis Minnie
- "The Ghosts of San Francisco" by Chris Clark
- "Gilman Street" (Berkeley) by The Mr. T Experience
- "Girl from Mill Valley" by The Jeff Beck Group
- "Girl in the Blue Velvet Band" by Peter Rowan
- "Golden Gate" by Al Jolson
- "The Golden Gate" by John Vanderslice
- "Golden Gate Bridge" by Rose Melberg
- "Goodbye San Francisco, Hello Amsterdam" by Doug Sahm
- "Goodnight, San Francisco" by The Bittersweets
- "Got the Date on the Golden Gate" by Mel Tormé
- "Grace Cathedral Hill" by The Decemberists
- "Grace Cathedral Park" by Red House Painters
- "The Grand Duchess of San Francisco" by American Music Club
- "Grant Avenue" by Rodgers and Hammerstein

=== H–K ===
- "The Haircut Song" by Ray Stevens
- "Haight Street" by Anberlin
- "Half Moon Bay" by Ronnie Day
- "Half Moon Bay" by Tom Grant
- "Half Moon Bay" by Train
- "Have a Nice Day" by Stereophonics
- "Hazy SF" by Six Organs of Admittance
- "He's the Greatest Dancer" by Sister Sledge
- "Hello, San Francisco" by Buddy Guy
- "Here in Frisco" by Merle Haggard
- "Honeymoon in San Francisco" by Of Montreal
- "Houston (I'm Comin' to See You)" by Glen Campbell
- "Hyde Park" by Further
- "Hyphy" by The Federation
- "I Fought the Law" by Dead Kennedys
- "I Left My Heart in San Francisco" by Tony Bennett
- "I'm Always Drunk in San Francisco" by Carmen McRae
- "If I Could Give All My Love (Richard Manuel Is Dead)" by Counting Crows
- "In the Sixties" by Sarine Voltage
- "Into Action" by Tim Armstrong featuring Skye Sweetnam
- "It's Christmas Once Again in San Francisco" by Barry De Vorzon
- "Josie" by John Stewart
- "Journey to the End of the East Bay" by Rancid
- "Judah to Ocean" by John Adams
- "Judy Is a Punk" by The Ramones
- "Julia (Come Out of the Rain)" by Josh Rouse
- "Jumpers" by Sleater-Kinney
- "Kid Charlemagne" by Steely Dan
- "King of Disco" by Akcent
- "Kinks Shirt" by Matt Nathanson

=== L–M ===
- "Left of the Dial" by The Replacements
- "Let's Go Back to San Francisco" (Parts 1 and 2) by The First Class (although recorded by Tony Burrows with this group, this two-part song appeared on a compilation album for The Flower Pot Men (Burrows' former group) later on)
- "Let's Go to San Francisco" (Parts 1 and 2) by The Flower Pot Men
- "Life in San Francisco" by Girls
- "Lights" by Journey
- "Lights Out in San Francisco" by Craig Chaquico
- "Linden Arden Stole the Highlights" by Van Morrison
- "A Little Bit of Everything" by Dawes
- "Livin' on the Fault Line" by The Doobie Brothers
- "Love on Haight Street" by BT
- "Luv n' Haight" by Sly and the Family Stone
- "Make Like Paper" by Red House Painters
- "Massachusetts" by Bee Gees
- "Massachusetts" by Silverstein
- "Matkalla San Franciscoon" by Edu Kettunen
- "Mean Old Frisco" by Arthur Crudup, covered by Eric Clapton, Jackie DeShannon
- "Mercury News" by Lucy Wainwright Roche
- "Million" by Paul Kantner & Grace Slick
- "Mill Valley" by Miss Abrams and the Strawberry Point Third Grade Class
- "Mission Bells" by The Aislers Set
- "Mission Bells" by Matt Nathanson
- "Mission in the Rain" by Jerry Garcia Band
- "The Mission is Bitchin" by The Units
- "Mission Street" by Vienna Teng
- "Misty Mountain Hop" by Led Zeppelin
- "Moi" by Lolo Zouaï
- "Moon over Marin" by Dead Kennedys
- "Mt. Diablo" by The Story So Far
- "My Brother Lived in San Francisco" by Joan Ryan
- "My Side of the City" by Beulah

=== N–R ===
- "NEMIZ" by Pamela Z
- "New Oakland" by Mistah F.A.B.
- "New Year's Kiss" by Casiotone for the Painfully Alone
- "New Zealand Pines" by John Vanderslice
- "Oakland" by Too Short
- "Oakland Nights" by The Lonely Island feat. Sia
- "Oakland Stroke" by Tower of Power
- "Olé! Tarantula" by Robyn Hitchcock
- "Pacific Dust" by The Mother Hips
- "Pacific Heights" by Pep Love
- "Palm Dreams" by Hayley Kiyoko
- "Palo Alto" by Radiohead
- "Perfect Blue Buildings" (Berkeley) by Counting Crows
- "Piazza, New York Catcher" by Belle and Sebastian
- "Planet Fillmore" by San Quinn
- "The Pleasure of Her Company" by Vic Damone
- "Rendez-Vous: Potrero Hill" by Architecture in Helsinki
- "Return to San Francisco" by Merle Haggard
- "Ride Captain Ride" by Blues Image
- "Ridgetop" by Jesse Colin Young
- "Roamer" by Enrique Iglesias
- "Rob Fraser's Welcome to San Francisco" by Eric Rigler & Alasdair Fraser
- "Rotten Stinking Mouthpiece" by The Mountain Goats
- "Russian Hill" by Jellyfish

== S ==
- "Sad But True" by Transplants (Berkeley)
- "Saint Dominic's Preview" by Van Morrison
- "Samba de Sausalito" by Santana
- "San Fran" by Kids of 88
- "San Franciscan Nights" by Eric Burdon & The Animals
- "San Francisco" by Walter Jurmann and Bronislaw Kaper, performed by Jeanette MacDonald, covered by Judy Garland
- "San Francisco" by Alkaline Trio
- "San Francisco" by Brett Dennen
- "San Francisco" by Brian Wilson and Van Dyke Parks
- "San Francisco" by 5 Seconds of Summer
- "San Francisco" by Cascada
- "San Francisco" by Die Flippers
- "San Francisco" by The Dingees
- "San Francisco" by Foxygen
- "San Francisco" by Frédéric François
- "San Francisco" by Hello Saferide
- "San Francisco" by Jill Sobule
- "San Francisco" by The KOLIN
- "San Francisco" by Kristin Hersh
- "San Francisco" by Lucero (band)
- "San Francisco" by Maxime Le Forestier
- "San Francisco" by Midicronica
- "San Francisco" by Mike Burns
- "San Francisco" by The Mowgli's
- "San Francisco" by MU330
- "San Francisco" by Niall Horan
- "San Francisco" by Rufus Wainwright
- "San Francisco" by Son of Dave
- "San Francisco" by Spouse
- "San Francisco" by Steve Tannen
- "San Francisco" by Ten Mile Tide
- "San Francisco" by Vanessa Carlton
- "San Francisco" by The Driver Era
- "San Francisco (In Situ)" by They Might Be Giants
- "San Francisco (Be Sure to Wear Flowers in Your Hair)" by Scott McKenzie
- "San Francisco (The Rhythm)" by Eskmo
- "San Francisco (You've Got Me)" by Village People
- "San Francisco, 1906" by Capybara
- "San Francisco Anthem" by San Quinn feat Big Rich and Boo Banga (Produced by Traxamillion)
- "San Francisco Bay" by Lee Oskar
- "San Francisco Bay Blues" by Jesse Fuller
- "San Francisco B.C." by Silver Jews
- "San Francisco Days" by Chris Isaak
- "San Francisco Fan" by Cab Calloway
- "San Francisco Fat" by NOFX
- "San Francisco FM Blues" by Doug Sahm
- "San Francisco Girls (Return of the Native)" by Fever Tree
- "San Francisco Holiday" by Thelonious Monk
- "San Francisco Hustle" by Silver Convention
- "San Francisco Is a Lonely Town" by Ben Peters
- "San Francisco Knights" by People Under the Stairs
- "San Francisco on the Water" by Arik Einstein
- "San Francisco Payphone" by Catch 22
- "San Francisco Saturdays" by John Callahan
- "San Francisco Song" by Camera Obscura
- "San Francisco Via Chicago Blues" by The Elected
- "San Francisco Woman" by Bob Lind
- "Sanfrandisco" by Dom Dolla
- "San-Ho-Zay" by Albert King
- "San Jose Serenade" by Eddie & the Tide
- "San Quentin" by Johnny Cash
- "Santa Rosa" by Nitty Gritty Dirt Band
- "Sausalito" by George Duke
- "Sausalito" by Conor Oberst
- "Sausalito Summernight" by Diesel
- "Save Me, San Francisco" by Train
- "Sequel" by Harry Chapin
- "The SFC" by RBL Posse, The Get Low Playay, and San Quinn
- "Shoot Out in Chinatown" by The Band
- "Sidewalks of San Francisco" by Trey Anastasio
- "Since '84" by Mac Dre
- "(Sittin' on) The Dock of the Bay" by Otis Redding
- "Sky High Honey" by Matt Nathanson
- "Snow in San Anselmo" by Van Morrison
- "So Long, San Francisco" by Glenn Yarbrough
- "Soul Shadows" by Bill Withers
- "The Sound of San Francisco" by Global Deejays
- "Standing on the Moon" by Grateful Dead
- "Step" by Vampire Weekend
- "Still in Saigon" by Charlie Daniels Band
- "Strawberry Wine" by Ryan Adams
- "Stuart and the Ave." by Green Day
- "Sunday Night in San Francisco" by Mel Tormé
- "Swansea" by Joanna Newsom

== T–Z ==
- "Take it Easy San Francisco" by Emily Wells
- "Tania" by Camper Van Beethoven
- "Taxi" by Harry Chapin
- "Telegraph Ave" by Childish Gambino
- "Tenderloin" by Rancid
- "Theme from The Streets of San Francisco" by Patrick Williams
- "Tiny Montgomery" by Bob Dylan
- "To: San Francisco" by The Spill Canvas
- "Vallejo" by Mac Dre
- "The Vowels, Pt. 2" by Why?
- "Wake Me Up in San Francisco" by Jackie Payne Steve Edmonson Band
- "We Built This City" by Starship
- "Welcome 2 Da Bay" by Yukmouth
- "Welcome to Paradise" by Green Day
- "When I Come Around" by Green Day
- "When the Fog Rolls in to San Francisco" by Damita Jo DeBlanc
- "Who Needs the Peace Corps?" by Frank Zappa
- "Yay Area" by E-40
- "You Always Said You Hated San Francisco" by Jonah Matranga
- "Young San Francisco" by Boy in Static

== See also ==
- List of songs about California
