= Freddy Cannon =

American rock and roll singer (1936–2026)

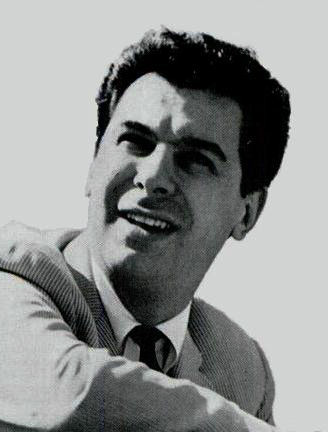
- Cannon in 1965

Background information
- Also known as: Freddy "Boom Boom" Cannon
- Born: Frederick Anthony Picariello Jr. December 4, 1936; Revere, Massachusetts, U.S.
- Died: July 17, 2026 (aged 89) Oxnard, California, U.S.
- Genre: Rock and roll
- Occupation: Singer
- Instruments: Vocals; guitar
- Years active: 1956–2026
- Labels: Swan; Warner; Sire; Buddah; MCAothers; US; Top Rank; Stateside; UK

Frederick Anthony Picariello Jr. (December 4, 1936 – July 17, 2026), better known by his stage name Freddy Cannon, was an American singer and musician, who was a pioneer of early rock and roll. His biggest international hits included "Tallahassee Lassie", "Way Down Yonder in New Orleans", and "Palisades Park".

== Early life and education ==
Frederick Anthony Picariello Jr. was born in Revere, Massachusetts, on December 4, 1936, and moved to neighboring Lynn, Massachusetts, as a child. His father worked as a truck driver and also played trumpet and sang in local bands. Cannon grew up listening to the rhythm and blues music of Big Joe Turner, Buddy Johnson and others on the radio, and he learned to play guitar. He attended Lynn Vocation High School.

== Career ==
Cannon made his recording debut as a singer in 1958, singing and playing rhythm guitar on a single, "Cha-Cha-Do" by the Spindrifts, which became a local hit. He had also played lead guitar on a session for an R&B vocal group, the G-Clefs, whose record "Ka-Ding Dong" made No. 24 on the Billboard Hot 100 in 1956. At a young age he joined the National Guard, took a job driving a truck, married, and became a father.

Inspired musically by Chuck Berry, Bo Diddley, and Little Richard, he formed his own group, Freddy Karmon & the Hurricanes, which became increasingly popular in the Greater Boston area, and began to develop a trademark strained singing style. He also became a regular on a local TV dance show, Boston Ballroom, and, in 1958, signed up to a management contract with Boston disc jockey Jack McDermott. With lyrics written by his mother, he prepared a new song which he called "Rock and Roll Baby", and he produced a demo which McDermott took to the writing and production team of Bob Crewe and Frank Slay. They rearranged the song, rewrote the lyrics, and offered to produce a recording in return for two-thirds of the composing credits. The first recording of the song, now titled "Tallahassee Lassie", with a guitar solo by session musician Kenny Paulson, was rejected by several record companies, but was then heard by TV presenter Dick Clark, who was a part-owner of Swan Records in Philadelphia.

Clark suggested that the song be re-edited and overdubbed to add excitement, by highlighting the pounding bass drum sound and adding hand claps and Freddy's cries of "whoo!", which later became one of his trademarks. The single was finally released by Swan Records, with the company president, Bernie Binnick, suggesting Freddy's new stage name of "Freddy Cannon". After being promoted and becoming successful in Boston and Philadelphia, the single gradually received national airplay. In 1959, it peaked at No. 6 on the Billboard Hot 100, becoming the first of his 22 songs to appear on the Billboard chart, and also reached No. 13 on the R&B singles chart. In the UK, where his early records were issued on the Top Rank label, it reached No. 17. "Tallahassee Lassie" sold over one million copies and was awarded a gold disc by the RIAA.

He stayed on the Swan label with producer Frank Slay for the next five years and became known as Freddy "Boom Boom" Cannon for the thumping power of his recordings. Crewe brought in The Four Seasons to provide instrumental backing for Cannon until the Seasons were able to break through to their own fame. Dick Clark brought him national exposure through his numerous appearances on his television program, American Bandstand, a record of 110 appearances in total. In the words of writer Cub Koda:

Freddy Cannon was a true believer, a rocker to the bone. Freddy Cannon made rock & roll records; great noisy rock & roll records, and all of them were infused with a gigantic drum beat that was an automatic invitation to shake it on down anyplace there was a spot to dance.

His second single "Okefenokee" (credited to Freddie Cannon, as were several of his other records) only made No. 43 on the charts, but the next record, "Way Down Yonder In New Orleans", a rocked-up version of a 1922 song, became a gold record and reached No. 3 on the pop charts in both the United States and the UK, the latter of which, where it was the biggest of his hits. It also sold over one million copies. Cannon toured in Britain and, in March 1960, his album The Explosive Freddy Cannon became the first album by a rock and roll singer to top the UK Albums Chart.

For the next two years, until early 1962, he continued to have lesser chart hits in the United States, in some cases with versions of old standards including "Chattanoogie Shoe Shine Boy" and Edward "Kid" Ory's "Muskrat Ramble". His hits also included "Twistin' All Night Long", recorded with Danny & the Juniors and also featuring Frankie Valli and the Four Seasons on backing vocals. However, one of his biggest hits came in May 1962 with "Palisades Park", written by future TV Gong Show host Chuck Barris. Produced by Slay with overdubbed rollercoaster sound effects, it reached No. 3 on the Hot 100, No. 15 on the R&B chart, and No. 20 in the UK. This release also sold over one million copies and gained gold disc status.

Cannon appeared with Bobby Vee, Johnny Tillotson, and others, in the movie Just for Fun, made in the UK in 1962. Although his popularity in the United States faded, he remained a popular touring act in Britain and elsewhere in the world for some years. In 1963, he signed with Warner Bros. Records where he recorded his last two United States top twenty hits, "Abigail Beecher" (No. 16) in 1964 and the following year "Action" (No. 13), from Dick Clark's TV show Where the Action Is, which he recorded with top Los Angeles session musicians including Leon Russell, James Burton, Glen Campbell, and David Gates. "Action" garnered a fourth gold disc for Cannon. Also in 1965, Slay acquired Cannon's Swan recordings and sold them to Warner Bros. He appeared, along with The Beau Brummels, in Village of the Giants, a teen movie with early film appearances by Beau Bridges and Ron Howard, and played himself, performing one of his songs, in the final episode of the teen soap opera, Never Too Young, on June 24, 1966.

Following his departure from Warner Bros. Records in 1967, Cannon released singles on several labels, including Sire, Royal American, Metromedia, MCA, Andee, Claridge, Horn, and Amherst. In the 1970s, he recorded and became a promotional man for Buddah Records, but returned to the lower reaches of the charts in 1981 with a cover of "Let's Put the Fun Back in Rock'n'Roll", recorded with the Belmonts for MiaSound Records, and in 1982 appeared in the independent movie, The Junkman. After that, he continued to work with Dick Clark at his American Bandstand reunion concerts and toured all over the world.

In 1988, he recorded a jingle version of "Palisades Park" for an ad campaign for the Pennsylvania's Kennywood Park resort; different lyrics were used for all the attractions (except the merry-go-round) and the park name, in order to match the attractions at Kennywood Park at the time—with different visuals (and jingle edits) for different versions of the commercial. In 2002, he released an album of seasonal songs, Have A Boom Boom Christmas!!

One notable fan of Cannon's was Box Tops and Big Star singer Alex Chilton; Chilton reportedly had a portrait of Cannon hanging on the wall of his home in New Orleans and had once offered the following comment about Cannon to a friend: "Freddy Cannon's shows always worked, because he moved through life with ease."

== Death ==
Cannon's wife and high school sweetheart Jeanette died in September 2024. Cannon died in hospice care in Oxnard, California, on July 17, 2026, following a brief period of cancer. He was 89. He was survived by two sons (one having predeceased him).

== Discography ==
=== Singles ===
Year	A-side, B-side Both sides from same album except where indicated	Label & Cat. No.	U.S. Pop	U.S. R&B	CAN	UK	Album
1959	"Tallahassee Lassie" b/w "You Know" (from Freddy Cannon's Solid Gold Hits!)	Swan 4031; Top Rank JAR135 (UK)	6	13	6	17	The Explosive Freddy Cannon
1959	"Okefenokee" b/w "Kookie Hat" (Non-album track)	Swan 4038	43	-	-	-	The Explosive Freddy Cannon
1959	"Way Down Yonder in New Orleans" b/w "Fractured" (Non-album track)	Swan 4043; Top Rank JAR247 (UK)	3	14	3	3	The Explosive Freddy Cannon
1960	"Chattanoogie Shoe Shine Boy" b/w "Boston (My Home Town)"	Swan 4050	34	-	27	-	The Explosive Freddy Cannon
1960	"California Here I Come" b/w "Indiana"	Top Rank JAR309 (UK)	-	-	-	33	The Explosive Freddy Cannon
1960	"Jump Over" (US A-side) / "The Urge" (UK A-side)	Swan 4053; Top Rank JAR369 (UK)	28	-	23	18	Freddy Cannon's Solid Gold Hits!
1960	"Happy Shades of Blue" b/w "(Kwa-Na-Va-Ka) Cuernavaca Choo Choo"	Swan 4057	83	-	-	-	Freddy Cannon's Solid Gold Hits!
1960	"Humdinger" b/w "My Blue Heaven" (from Freddy Cannon Sings Happy Shades of Blue)	Swan 4061	59	-	-	-	Freddy Cannon's Solid Gold Hits!
1960	"Muskrat Ramble" b/w "Two Thousand-88"	Swan 4066; Top Rank JAR548 (UK)	54	-	-	32	Freddy Cannon's Solid Gold Hits!
1961	"Buzz Buzz A-Diddle-It" /	Swan 4071	51	-	15	-	Freddy Cannon's Solid Gold Hits!
1961	"Opportunity"	Swan 4071	114	-	-	-	Freddy Cannon's Solid Gold Hits!
1961	"Transistor Sister" b/w "Walk to the Moon" (Non-album track)	Swan 4078	35	-	8	-	Palisades Park
1961	"For Me And My Gal" b/w "Blue Plate Special" (from Freddy Cannon Sings Happy Shades Of Blue)	Swan 4083	71	-	-	-	Palisades Park
1962	"Twistin' All Night Long" (with Danny and The Juniors) b/w "Some Kind of Nut" (by Danny and The Juniors)"	Swan 4092	68	-	-	-	Non-album tracks
1962	"Teen Queen of the Week" b/w "Wild Guy" (Non-album track)	Swan 4096	92	-	12	-	Palisades Park
1962	"Palisades Park" b/w "June, July and August"	Swan 4106; Stateside SS101 (UK)	3	15	2	20	Palisades Park
1962	"What's Gonna Happen When Summer's Done" b/w "Broadway"	Swan 4117	45	-	-	-	Freddy Cannon Steps Out
1962	"If You Were a Rock And Roll Record" b/w "The Truth, Ruth" (Non-album track)	Swan 4122	67	-	-	-	Freddy Cannon Steps Out
1963	"Four Letter Man" b/w "Come On and Love Me" (from Freddy Cannon Steps Out)	Swan 4132	121	-	-	-	Non-album track
1963	"Patty Baby" b/w "Betty Jean"	Swan 4139	65	-	8	-	Freddy Cannon Steps Out
1963	"Everybody Monkey" b/w "Oh Gloria" (Non-album track)	Swan 4149	52	-	24	-	Freddy Cannon Steps Out
1963	"That's the Way Girls Are" b/w "Do What the Hippies Do"	Swan 4155	-	-	-	-	Freddy Cannon Steps Out
1963	"Sweet Georgia Brown" b/w "What a Party" (from Freddy Cannon Steps Out)	Swan 4168	-	-	-	-	Non-album tracks
1963	"The Ups and Downs of Love" b/w "It's Been Nice"	Swan 4178	-	-	-	-	Non-album tracks
1964	"Abigail Beecher" b/w "All American Girl"	Warner Bros. 5409	16	-	11	-	Freddie Cannon
1964	"Odie Cologne" b/w "O.K. Wheeler, The Used Car Dealer"	Warner Bros. 5434	-	-	-	-	Non-album tracks
1964	"Gotta Good Thing Goin'" b/w "Summertime, U.S.A."	Warner Bros. 5448	-	-	-	-	Non-album tracks
1964	"Too Much Monkey Business" b/w "Little Autograph Seeker"	Warner Bros. 5487	-	-	-	-	Non-album tracks
1964	"In the Night" b/w "Little Miss a Go-Go-Go"	Warner Bros. 5615	132	-	-	-	Non-album tracks
1965	"Action" b/w "Beachwood City"	Warner Bros. 5645	13	-	5	-	Action!
1965	"Let Me Show You Where It's At" b/w "The Old Rag Man" (Non-album track)	Warner Bros. 5666	127	-	-	-	Action!
1965	"She's Somethin' Else" b/w "Little Bitty Corrine" (Non-album track)	Warner Bros. 5673	-	-	-	-	Action!
1966	"The Dedication Song" b/w "Come On, Come On"	Warner Bros. 5693	41	-	48	-	Non-album tracks
1966	"The Greatest Show on Earth" b/w "Hokie Pokie Girl"	Warner Bros. 5810	-	-	-	-	Non-album tracks
1966	"The Laughing Song" b/w "Natalie"	Warner Bros. 5832	111	-	-	-	Non-album tracks
1966	"Run for the Sun" b/w "Use Your Imagination"	Warner Bros. 5859	-	-	-	-	Non-album tracks
1966	"In My Wildest Dreams" b/w "A Happy Clown"	Warner Bros. 5876	-	-	-	-	Non-album tracks
1967	"Maverick's Flat" b/w "Run To The Poet Man"	Warner Bros. 7019	-	-	-	-	Non-album tracks
1967	"20th Century Fox" b/w "Cincinnati Woman"	Warner Bros. 7075	-	-	-	-	Non-album tracks
1968	"Rock Around the Clock" b/w "Sock It to the Judge"	We Make Rock'N Roll Records 1601	121	-	-	-	Non-album tracks
1968	"Sea Cruise" b/w "She's a Friday Night Fox"	We Make Rock'N Roll Records 1604	-	-	-	-	Non-album tracks
1969	"Beautiful Downtown Burbank" b/w "If You Give Me a Title"	Sire ST 4103	-	-	-	-	Non-album tracks
1969	"Strawberry Wine" b/w "Blossom Dear"	Royal American RA 288	-	-	-	-	Non-album tracks
1970	"Charged-Up, Turned-Up Rock-N-Roll Singer" b/w "I Ain't Much But I'm Yours"	Royal American RA 2	-	-	-	-	Non-album tracks
1970	"Night Time Lady" b/w "I Ain't Much But I'm Yours"	Royal American RA 11	-	-	-	-	Non-album tracks
1971	"Rockin' Robin" b/w "Red Valley"	Buddah BDA 242	-	-	-	-	Non-album tracks
1972	"If You've Got The Time"	Metromedia MM 262	-	-	-	-	Non-album tracks
1974	"Rock N'Roll A-B-C's" b/w "Superman"	MCA 40269	-	-	-	-	Non-album tracks
1975	"I Loves Ya" b/w "Chomp-Chomp, Sooey-Sooey" (By Cannon's Express)	Andee 4001	-	-	-	-	Non-album tracks
1976	"Sugar" b/w "Sugar – Part Two"	Claridge 416	-	-	-	-	Non-album tracks
1981	"Suzanne Somers" b/w "Blankcheck's Market" (by Freddie and Connie W. Cannon)	Horn HR-8	-	-	-	-	Non-album tracks
1981	"Let's Put The Fun Back In Rock N Roll" b/w "Your Mama Ain't Always Right" (with the Belmonts)	MiaSound 1002	81	-	-	-	Non-album tracks
1983	"Dance To The Bop" b/w "She's A Mean Rebel Rouser"	Amherst AM-201	-	-	-	-	Non-album tracks
1988	"Rockin' In My Socks" b/w "Rockin' In My Socks" (Instrumental)	Amherst AM-327	-	-	-	-	Non-album tracks
2013	"The Sox Are Rockin'" b/w "Red Sox Nation" (with Los Straitjackets)	Spinout Records SPIN 45-028	-	-	-	-	Non-album tracks
2016	"Svengoolie Stomp" b/w "Svengoolie Stomp & Svengoolie Stomp (Sing-A-Long)"	Wonderclap Records W7 1002	-	-	-	-	

=== Albums ===
Sources:

- The Explosive Freddy Cannon (1960, Swan LP 502 (Mono)/S 502 (Stereo)) – UK No. 1
- Freddy Cannon Sings Happy Shades of Blue (1960, Swan LP 504)
- Freddy Cannon's Solid Gold Hits (1961, Swan LP 505)
- Palisades Park (1962, Swan LP 507) – US No. 101
- Steps Out (1962, Swan LPS 511)
- Bang On (1963, Stateside Records SL 10013) – European release of Palisades Park
  The above five albums were issued in mono only
- Freddie Cannon (1964, Warner Bros. W 1544 (Mono)/WS 1544 (Stereo))
- Action (1965, Warner Bros. W 1612/WS 1612)
- Freddy Cannon's Greatest Hits (1966, Warner Bros. W 1628/WS 1628) – Greatest hits from both Swan and Warner Bros. labels
- 14 Booming Hits (1982, Rhino RNDF 210)
- His Latest & Greatest (1991, Critique)
- The Best of Freddy "Boom Boom" Cannon (1995, Rhino)
- Where the Action Is: The Very Best 1964–1981 (2002, Varese Sarabande)
- Have a Boom Boom Christmas!! (2002, Gotham)
- The Best of Freddy Cannon (Collectibles, 2003)
- Boom Boom Rock 'n' Roll: The Best of Freddy Cannon (Shout! Factory, 2009)

== See also ==
- List of rock and roll performers
- List of Italian American entertainers
- List of acts who appeared on American Bandstand
- List of guests appearing on The Midnight Special
