= The Explosive Freddy Cannon =

Studio album by Freddy Cannon
- Released: February 26, 1960
- Recorded: 1959
- Genre: Pop
- Length: 27:02
- Label: Swan; Top Rank
- Producer: Bob Crewe, Frank Slay

Freddy Cannon chronology
The Explosive Freddy Cannon (1960)	Freddy Cannon Sings Happy Shades of Blue (1962)

Singles from The Explosive Freddy Cannon
- 1. "Tallahassee Lassie" Released: May 1959; 2. "Okefenokee" Released: August 1959; 3. "Way Down Yonder In New Orleans" Released: October 1959; 4. "Chattanoogie Shoe Shine Boy" Released: January 1960; 5. "California Here I Come" Released: February 1960 (UK only)

Professional ratings
Review scores
Source	Rating
The Encyclopedia of Popular Music	4/5 stars
The New Rolling Stone Record Guide	2/5 stars

The Explosive Freddy Cannon is the debut album of Freddy Cannon. Released in 1960, it spent one week at number one in the United Kingdom; it was Cannon's only number one album. It was also the first rock 'n' roll album to reach No. 1 on the UK albums chart, in part due to its cheaper price.

== Track listing ==
1. "Boston (My Home Town)" (Bob Crewe, Frank Slay) – 2:02
2. "Kansas City" (Jerry Leiber & Mike Stoller) – 2:14
3. "Sweet Georgia Brown" (Ben Bernie, Kenneth Casey, Maceo Pinkard) – 2:16
4. "Way Down Yonder In New Orleans" (Henry Creamer, Turner Layton) – 2:29
5. "St Louis Blues" (W. C. Handy) – 2:38
6. "Indiana" (Ballard MacDonald, James F. Hanley) – 1:46
7. "Chattanoogie Shoe Shine Boy" (Harry Stone, Jack Stapp) – 2:17
8. "Deep in the Heart of Texas" (Don Swander, June Hershey) – 1:42
9. "California Here I Come" (Al Jolson, B. G. De Sylva, Joseph Meyer) – 2:04
10. "Okefenokee" (Crewe, Slay) – 2:30
11. "Carolina In The Morning" (Gus Kahn, Walter Donaldson) – 2:30
12. "Tallahassee Lassie" (Crewe, Slay, Frederick A. Picariello) – 2:34

== Personnel ==
Tallahassee Lassie, Lead Guitar- Gary C. Hicks, Sr.

=== Technical ===
- Bob Crewe, Frank Slay, Jr. – producers, arrangements
- Sid Bass – arrangements
- George Schowerer – engineer
- Otto Fern – photography

== Charts ==
=== Singles ===
Year	Single	US	UK
1959	"Tallahassee Lassie"	6	17
1960	"Way Down Yonder In New Orleans"	3	3
1960	"Chattanoogie Shoe Shine Boy"	34	
1960	"California Here I Come"		24
