= Tallahassee Lassie =

Single by Freddy Cannon

from the album The Explosive! Freddy Cannon
- B-side: "You Know"
- Released: May 1959
- Genre: Rock and roll
- Length: 2:30
- Label: Swan
- Songwriters: Bruce Moore, Bob Crewe, Frank Slay, Frederick Picariello
- Producers: Bob Crewe, Frank Slay

Freddy Cannon singles chronology
"Tallahassee Lassie" (1959)	"Okefenokee" (1959)

"Tallahassee Lassie" is a song written by Bruce Moore, Bob Crewe, Frank Slay, and Frederick Picariello and performed by Freddy Cannon (Picariello's stage name). The song was featured on his 1960 album The Explosive! Freddy Cannon. The song was produced and arranged by Bob Crewe and Frank Slay. Guitarist Kenny Paulson played the opening riff and backed Cannon on this record.

== Chart performance ==
It reached #6 on the U.S. pop chart, #13 on the U.S. R&B chart, #6 in Canada, and #17 on UK Singles Chart in 1959. The song was ranked #40 on Billboard's Year-End Hot 100 singles of 1959. It sold over one million copies, and was awarded a gold disc by the RIAA.

== Other charting versions ==
- Tommy Steele released a version of the song which reached #16 on the UK Singles chart in 1959.

== Other versions ==
- Hep Stars released a version of the song on their 1965 album Hep Stars on Stage.
- Flamin' Groovies released a version of the song as the B-side to their 1972 single "Slow Death".
- Shakin' Stevens and the Sunsets released a version of the song on their 1972 Budget Album Rockin' & Shakin' With Shakin' Stevens and the Sunsets album (Re-Released in 1981) and again on the 1973 album Shakin' Stevens & the Sunsets.
- Hurriganes released a version on their 1974 album Roadrunner.
- Mud released a version of the song on their 1975 album Mud Rock Vol. 2.
- The Beach Boys covered the song and paired it with "Talk to Me" on their 1976 album 15 Big Ones.
- The Sonics released a version of the song on their 1980 album Sinderella.
- The Inmates released a version of the song as the B-side to their 1981 single "(I Thought I Heard A) Heartbeat".
- The Del-Lords released a version of the song on their 1989 album Howlin' at the Halloween Moon.
- 1313 Mockingbird Lane released a version of the song on their 1993 album Triskaidekaphobia.
- Fleetwood Mac released a version of the song on their 1995 album Live at the BBC.
- Los Straitjackets released a version of the song as "Chica Alboratada" on their 2001 album Sing Along with Los Straitjackets.
- The Rolling Stones released a version of the song on their 2011 re-release of the album Some Girls.
- The Record Company released a version of the song as the B-side to their 2012 single "This Crooked City".
