= I Love You, California =

State anthem of the U.S. state of California

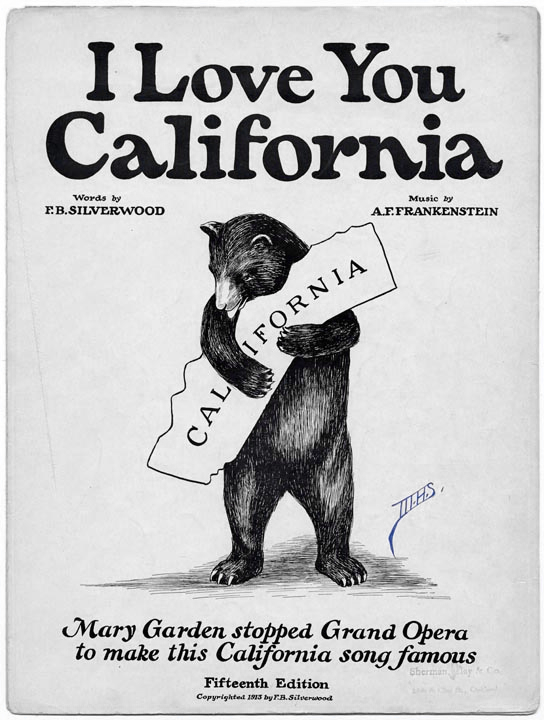
- Regional anthem of California
- Lyrics: Francis Beatty Silverwood, 1913
- Music: Abraham Franklin Frankenstein, 1913
- Published: 1913; 113 years ago
- Adopted: April 26, 1951; 75 years ago
- Readopted: 1987; 39 years ago

Audio sample
- "I Love You, California" (instrumental): file; help

"I Love You, California" is the state song and regional anthem of the U.S. state of California, originally published in 1913. It was adopted in 1951 and reconfirmed in 1987 as the official state song.

The lyrics were written by Francis Beatty Silverwood (1863–1924), a Los Angeles clothier, and the words were subsequently put to music by Abraham Franklin Frankenstein (1873–1934), then conductor of the Orpheum Theatre Orchestra, with an inaugural performance by Mary Garden. Frankenstein was a cousin of the San Francisco Chronicle's long-time music and art critic Alfred V. Frankenstein. The song was published by Hatch & Loveland, Music Printers, Los Angeles, California, and copyrighted by F.B. Silverwood in 1913. It was the official song of expositions held in San Francisco and San Diego in 1915.

== History ==
"I Love You, California"
1913 performance by the Knickerbocker Quartet and Elizabeth Spencer

"I Love You, California"
1917 Columbia Records instrumental recording

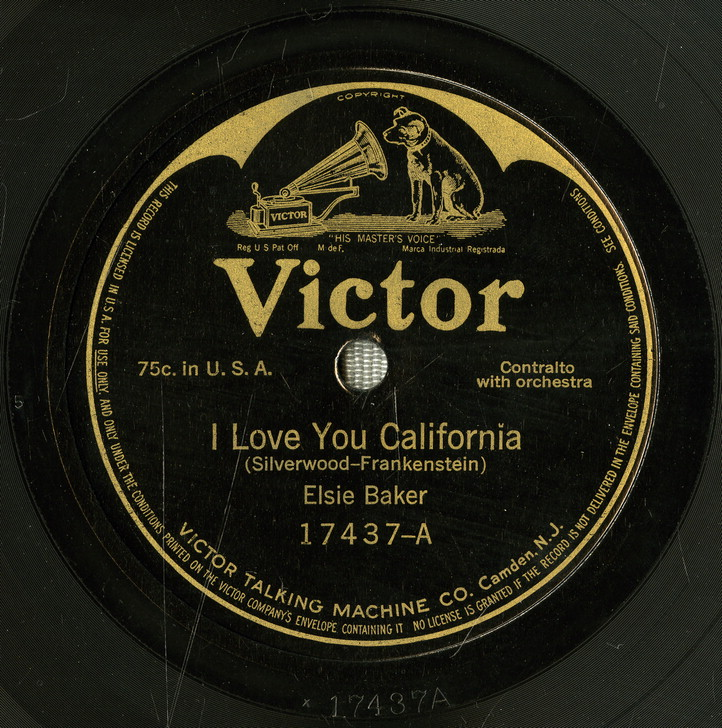
Victor Records

=== Premiere ===
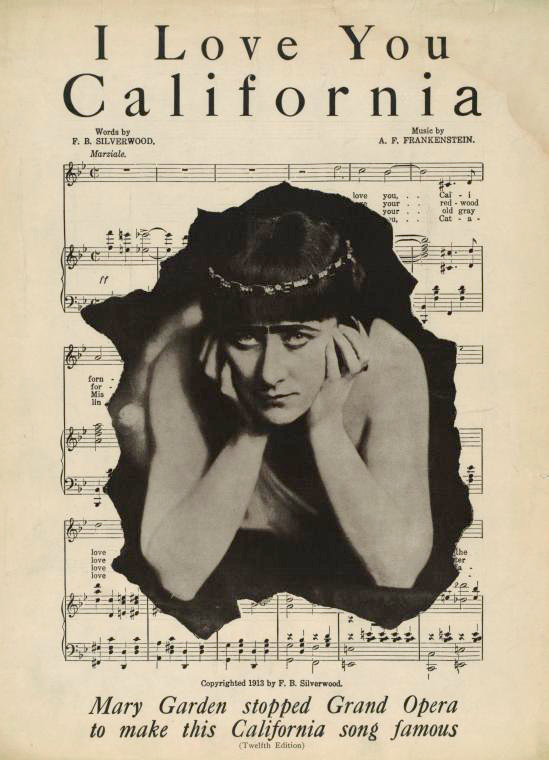
Cover of the sheet music for "I Love You, California" featuring Mary Garden

Later in 1913, the song was introduced by opera star Mary Garden, associated with the Chicago Grand Opera at that time. "Mary Garden stopped Grand Opera to make this California song famous," read the notices virtually ensuring the popularity and success of the new song. The renowned soprano wrote on stationery from the Hotel Alexandria in Los Angeles:

Dear Mr. Silverwood: I am proud to be the first to sing your most beautiful song in public — and I hope for it a wonderful success here in California and everywhere! Sincerely, Mary Garden

=== Played aboard the SS Ancon ===
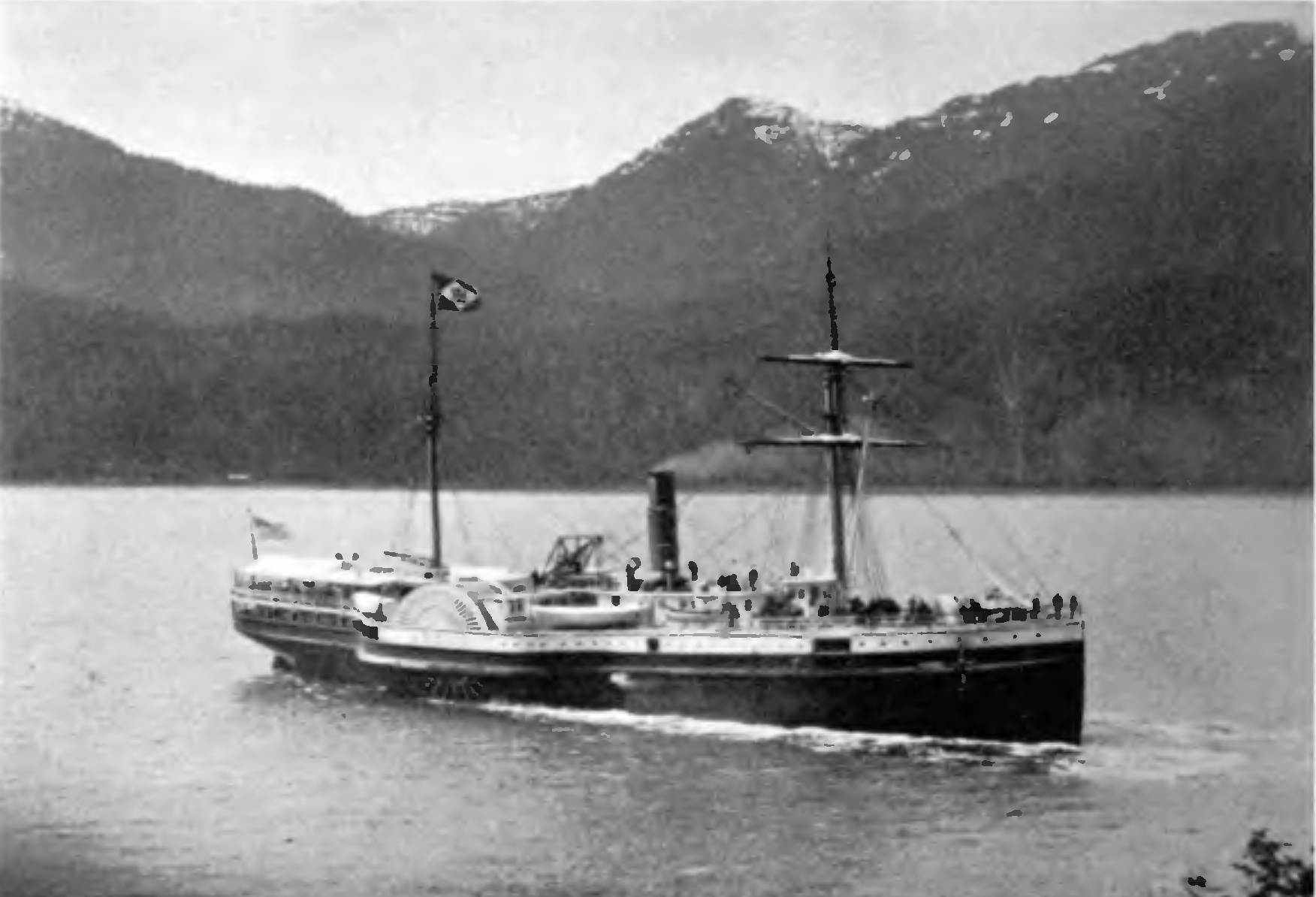
Steamship Ancon sometime before 1895 (source: E.W. Wright, ed., Lewis & Dryden Marine History of the Pacific Northwest, Lewis & Dryden Printing Co., Portland, 1895)

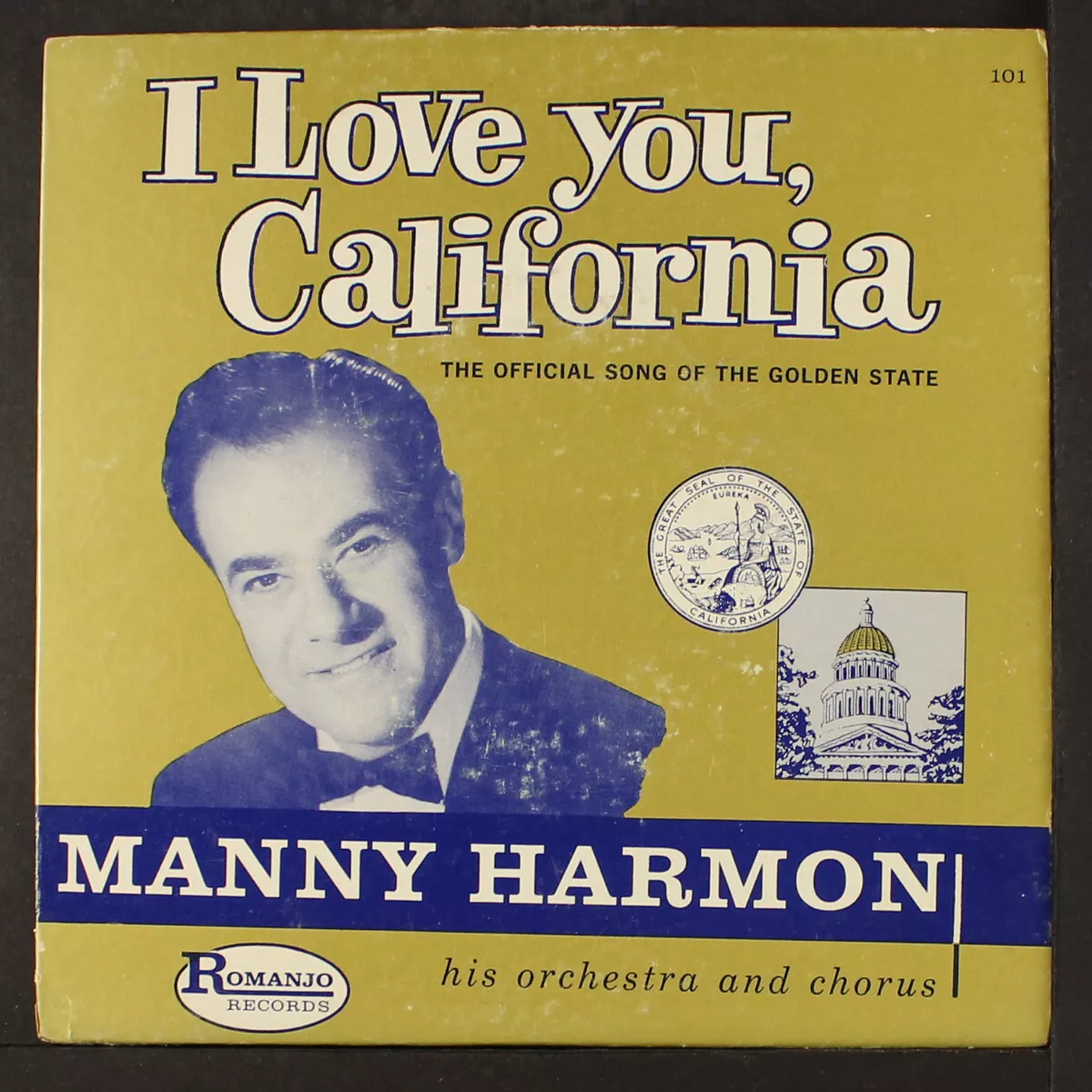
Cover of Manny Harmon's 1964 recording of "I Love You California"

"I Love You, California" was played aboard the steamship Ancon, which on August 14, 1914, became the first merchant ship to pass through the Panama Canal.

=== State legislative designation ===
In 1951, the State Legislature passed a resolution designating it as California's state song. California Government Code section 421.7 states, "'I Love You, California', a song published in 1913 with lyrics by F.B. Silverwood and music by A.F. Frankenstein, is an official state song."

In 1987, "I Love You, California" became the official state song by law.

== Commercial use ==
In late 2012, Jeep began running a TV advertisement in California, with "I Love You, California" as the soundtrack and visuals showing the Californian state flower, Californian flag, and other Californian icons.

The song also serves as the theme music for the state’s public television human interest series “California’s Golden Parks”, presented by Huell Howser.

== In popular culture ==
An arrangement of the song is heard when the player builds the Golden Gate Bridge in Civilization VI: Gathering Storm, accompanied by the first four lines of Percy Bysshe Shelley's poem A Bridal Song that references the "golden gate." Coincidentally, Shelley's wife Mary wrote Frankenstein, which is the name of the song's composer.

== Lyrics ==
I.
I love you, California, you're the greatest state of all.
I love you in the winter, summer, spring and in the fall.
I love your fertile valleys; your dear mountains I adore.
I love your grand old ocean and I love her rugged shore.

Chorus
When the snow crowned Golden Sierras
Keep their watch o'er the valleys bloom,
It is there I would be in our land by the sea,
Every breeze bearing rich perfume.
It is here nature gives of her rarest. It is Home Sweet Home to me,
And I know when I die I shall breathe my last sigh
For my sunny California.

II.
I love your red-wood forests – love your fields of yellow grain.
I love your summer breezes and I love your winter rain.
I love you, land of flowers; land of honey, fruit and wine.
I love you, California; you have won this heart of mine.

III.
I love your old gray Missions – love your vineyards stretching far.
I love you, California, with your Golden Gate ajar.
I love your purple sun-sets, love your skies of azure blue.
I love you, California; I just can't help loving you.

IV.
I love you, Catalina, you are very dear to me.
I love you, Tamalpais, and I love Yosemite.
I love you, Land of Sunshine, half your beauties are untold.
I loved you in my childhood, and I'll love you when I'm old.

== Other non-official state songs ==
Prior to the adoption of "I Love You, California", several attempts were made to adopt other compositions as the official state song. In 1921, Lynden Ellsworth Behymer (1862–1947), impresario, and Bessie Bartlett Frankel (Mrs. Cecil Frankel) (1884–1959), donated a sum of money to the California Federation of Music Clubs to hold a contest for lyrics to a state song "of real value." The judges were Benjamin Franklin Field (1868–1960), chairman of the federation and chairman of the committee of judges, Grace Atherton Dennen (1874–1927), editor and publisher of The Lyric West, and Blanche Robinson (Mrs. Martin Hennion Robinson) (née Williams; 1883–1969), composer. The original deadline, October 1, 1921, was extended to December 31, 1921 and the prize money was increased to $100. The judges selected Mary Lennox of San Francisco on January 17, 1922, as the winner was "California, Sweet Homeland of Mine":

You're the land at the foot of the rainbow,
Where the great pot of treasure was spilled
That is fashioned anew by the sunshine and dew,
Into marvels of bright hopes fulfilled;
You're land where each fair trail leads homeward,
'Neath the palm of the sheltering pine
California, sweet homeland of mine.

== See also ==
List of U.S. state songs
