= Huell Howser =

American television personality (1945–2013)

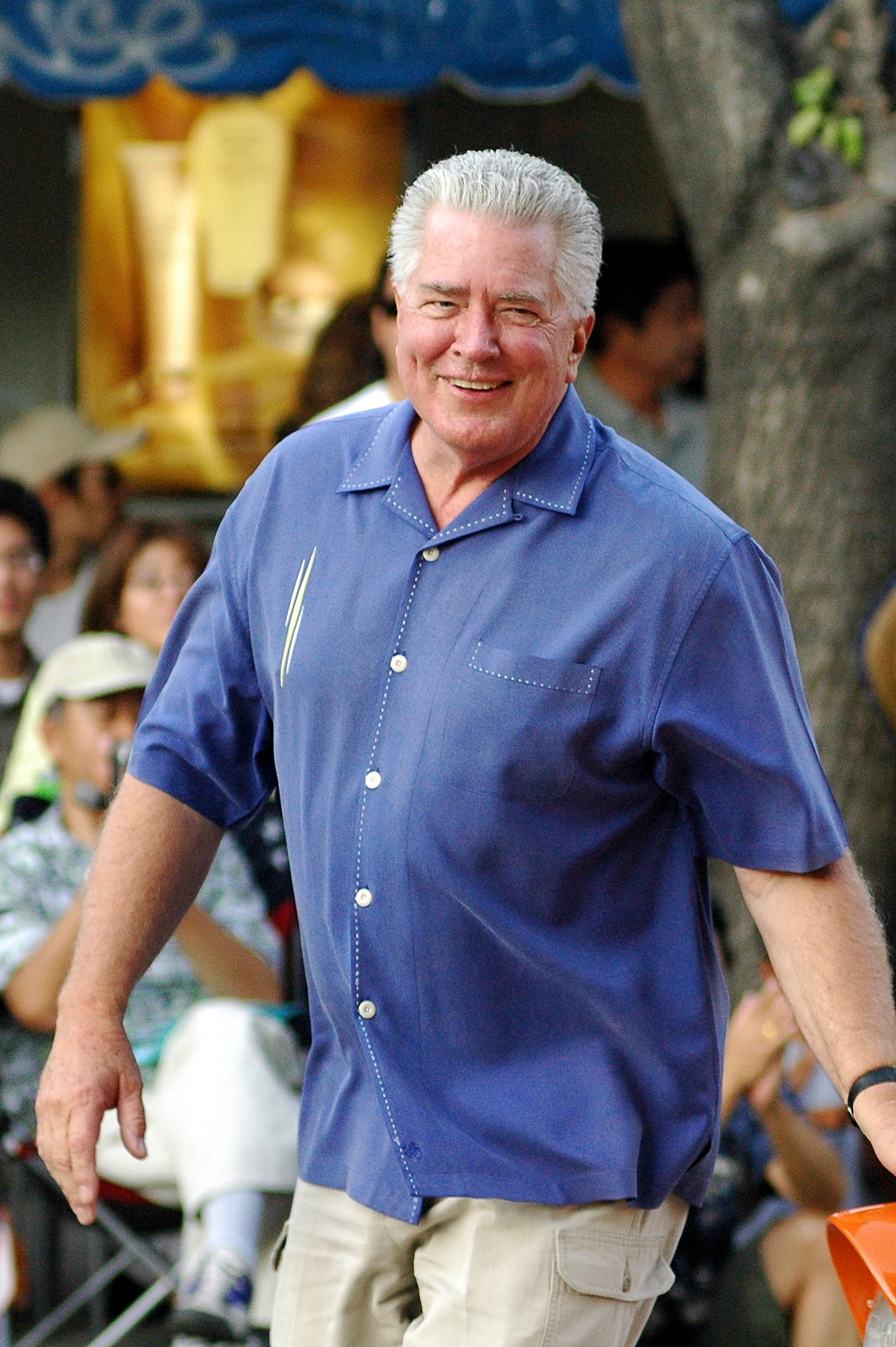
- Howser at the Nisei Week Grand Parade in Los Angeles, California, 2007
- Born: Huell Burnley Howser; October 18, 1945; Gallatin, Tennessee, U.S.
- Died: January 7, 2013 (aged 67); Palm Springs, California, U.S.
- Resting place: Ashes scattered off the coast of Los Angeles County, California
- Education: University of Tennessee
- Occupations: Television personality, actor, producer, writer, singer, voice artist
- Years active: 1973–2012

Huell Burnley Howser (October 18, 1945 – January 7, 2013) was an American television personality, actor, producer, writer, singer, and voice artist, best known for hosting, producing, and writing California's Gold and his human interest show Visiting...with Huell Howser, produced by KCET in Los Angeles for California PBS stations. The archive of his video chronicles offers an enhanced understanding of the history, culture, and people of California. He also voiced the Backson in Winnie the Pooh (2011).

== Early life ==
Howser was born in Gallatin, Tennessee, on October 18, 1945, to Harold Chamberlain and Jewell Havens (Burnley) Howser. Howser's first name is a portmanteau of his parents' given names, Harold and Jewell, as Howser explained in the California's Gold episode "Smartsville."

Howser graduated from the University School of Nashville in 1963, then studied history and political science at the University of Tennessee, where he served as student body president.

== Career ==
After serving in the U.S. Marine Corps Reserve and on the staff of U.S. Senator Howard Baker, Howser began his television career at WSMV-TV in Nashville, Tennessee, where he produced shows focused on human interest stories, such as Happy Features and The Happy World of Huell Howser. Howser was also a television personality working for the University of Tennessee.

After working in New York City as the host of WCBS-TV's Real Life show, Howser moved to Los Angeles, California, in 1981 to work as a reporter for KCBS-TV. During 1982 and 1983, he served as weekend host and correspondent for Entertainment Tonight. In 1983, he joined KCET (then a PBS affiliate) as host and producer of Videolog, a series of brief human-interest segments running less than 10 minutes each, that aired in between the station's shorter programs to fill up air time. "Videolog" eventually became one of the more popular programs on KCET, and in 1990, the show was expanded to half hour-long episodes. Included in Videolog was lint artist Slater Barron among other topics relevant to Los Angeles and adjacent communities.

=== California's Gold ===
In 1991, after spending his vacation driving across the Golden State and visiting with all 13 PBS stations in California, California's Gold premiered in April of that year. California's Gold highlights small towns, landmarks, events, or places of interest throughout California that are not well known to the general public. Howser conducted informal, often impromptu, interviews with locals involved with the sites he visited. He also produced California's Communities, California's Golden Fairs, Downtown, California's Water, California's Green, California's Golden Coast, California's Golden Parks, Road Trip, Visiting...with Huell Howser, California Missions, Palm Springs, Our Neighborhoods, The Bench, and various specials.

=== Visiting...with Huell Howser ===
Visiting...with Huell Howser was a weekly PBS series hosted by Howser that originally aired from 1991 until his retirement in 2012 that focused on "the diverse people, places, and events that make southern California such a unique community."

As of 2025, KCET and other southern California PBS stations continue to rerun this popular series. Episodes can be viewed on demand on the web sites of Chapman University and select PBS affiliates. Randomly shuffled episodes can also be seen around the clock on KCET's "24/7 Huell Howser Live Stream" YouTube channel.

=== Other work ===
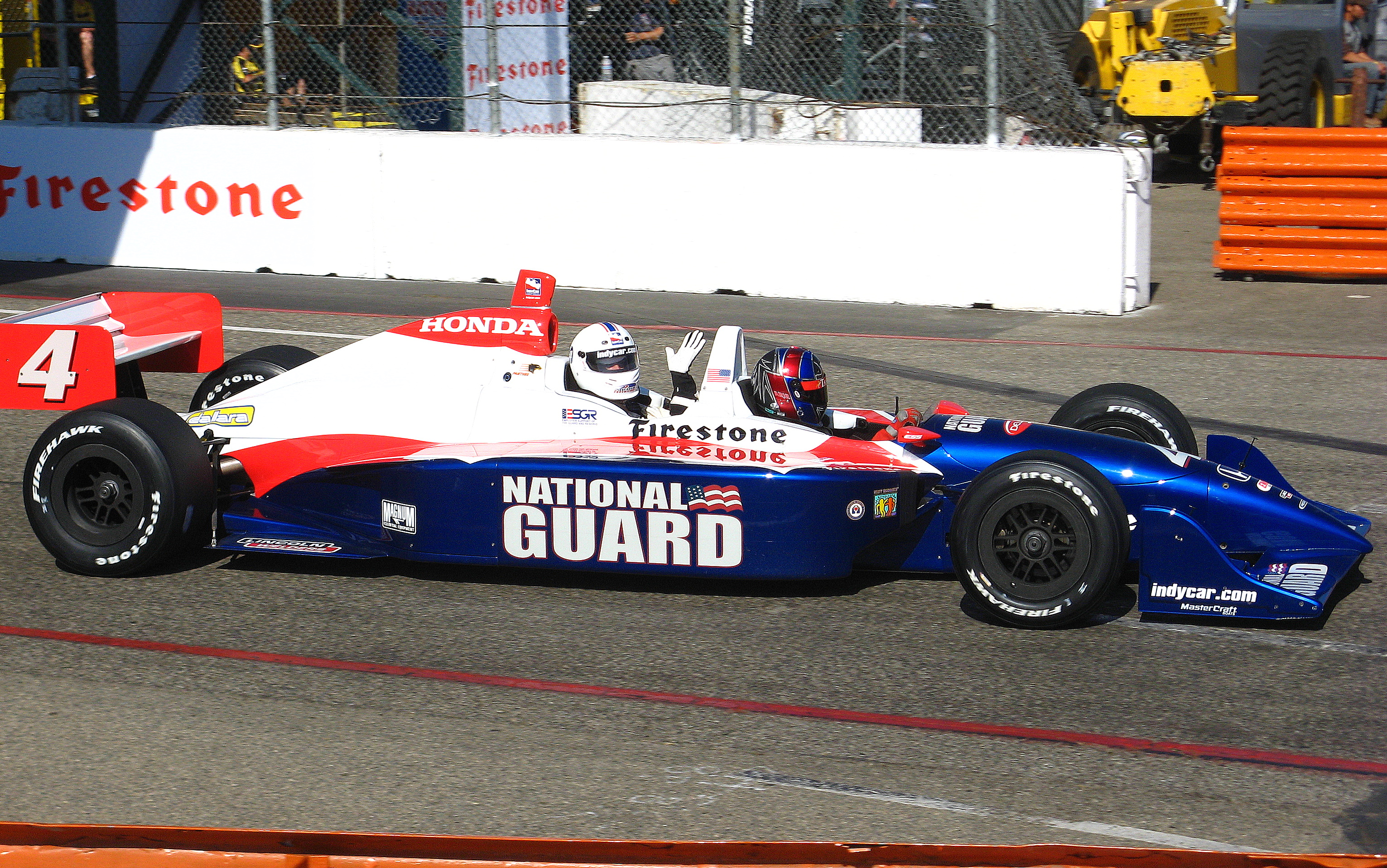
Howser riding in a tandem INDYCAR race car at the 2009 Long Beach Grand Prix

Articles written by Howser appeared in Westways, the magazine of the Automobile Club of Southern California.

In 1997, he featured prominently as himself alongside Tracey Ullman in character as Ruby Romaine in the Tracey Takes On... episode "Hollywood."

Howser spearheaded an unsuccessful effort to stop the demolition of buildings designed by Paul Williams at the Long Beach Naval Shipyard.

He appeared in Who Killed the Electric Car? (2006) in his capacity as a reporter, witnessing the demolition and shredding of a Honda EV Plus.

In 2009, Howser appeared as himself in the twenty-first season Simpsons episode "O Brother, Where Bart Thou?", where he hosted Under the Wrapper, a program similar to Food Network's Unwrapped.

In 2011, Howser voiced the Backson in the post-credits scene of Walt Disney Animation Studios' feature film Winnie the Pooh.

== Personal life ==
Howser lived in the historic El Royale apartments in Los Angeles, California, in an apartment which had previously been home to character actor William Frawley. Howser also had homes in Palm Springs and Twentynine Palms.

On June 29, 2015, Howser's Twentynine Palms home became available for rentals and weddings.

Howser mentioned that he was a Methodist during his episode covering the Nevada County Fair on California's Golden Fairs.

=== Volcano House ===
In 2003, Howser purchased the 1,800-square-foot (170 m^{2}) Volcano House, which is situated on a volcanic cinder cone in the Mojave Desert just outside the town of Newberry Springs, California (near Barstow), along with 60 acres (24 ha) of land and a man-made lake.

In 2010, Howser put the unusual residence on the market for $650,000. In June 2012, The Panther, a student-run newspaper for Chapman University, announced that Howser had donated the Volcano House to the school. On September 3, 2015, Chapman University sold the Volcano House for $750,000.

== Retirement and death ==
On November 27, 2012, The Sacramento Bee reported that Howser was retiring from making new shows, amid speculation in the television community that he was seriously ill.According to Luis Fuerte's book, "Louie, Take a Look at This! My Time with Huell Howser," Howser ended productions on all his shows in December of 2011.

On January 7, 2013 at 2:35 a.m., Howser died at his Palm Springs home, at the age of 67. He had had cancer for about two years according to his assistant Ryan Morris, when "Howser began the process of donating nearly everything he owned to Chapman University in Orange, where he also established a scholarship." His death certificate listed metastatic prostate cancer as the cause. Howser's body was cremated and his ashes were scattered at sea off the coast of Los Angeles County.

On January 15, 2013, a memorial was held for Howser, who said before his death that he did not want a funeral as he did not want attention.

== Legacy ==
Howser's image on a Broguiere's Montebello Dairy bottle

Howser donated his videotaped collection of California's Gold episodes, as well as those of his other series, to Chapman University in 2011. He also donated his personal papers, and a large collection of books on California history to the university. The school established the Huell Howser Archives, which offers the public free access to the entire digitized collection of his life's work. The archives can be accessed at Chapman University as well as on the internet. He also gave his extensive art collection, which consists mostly of "found-object" art collected during his travels, to the university, and endowed the California's Gold Scholarship Fund. Upon his death he bequeathed his remaining two homes to the university, the proceeds from the sale of which were added to the scholarship fund.

Testimonials to Howser's unique contribution to the celebration of California history and culture were acknowledged in numerous media sources upon word of his death. Gustavo Arellano, then-editor of the OC Weekly, called Howser "the greatest Californian since Hiram Johnson," noting that for Howser, "California was the ultimate temple of the American dream." This reflects the high regard in which many Californians hold Howser's unabashedly enthusiastic promotion of their state's heritage.

In 2015, a Golden Palm Star on the Palm Springs Walk of Stars was dedicated to him.

== In popular culture ==
Howser's enthusiastic style as host of his various travel shows led to him being impersonated and lampooned by comedians and radio personalities, such as Adam Carolla, Dana Gould, Ralph Garman, and James Adomian.

Matt Groening has stated he is a fan of Howser and featured him in two episodes of The Simpsons: "There's Something About Marrying," in which a character named Howell Huser (voiced by Karl Wiedergott) falls off a turnip truck, and "O Brother, Where Bart Thou?," in which the real Howser presents a program similar to Marc Summers' Unwrapped television program titled Under the Wrapper. Howser received a voice credit for the episode. The Simpsons episode "A Test Before Trying" commemorated his death with a quick cartoon memorial shot at the end of the episode, stating: "In Memory of Huell Howser, Friend of the Simpsons and a friend of California."

== Filmography ==
Year	Title	Role	
1998	Tracey Takes On...	Himself	Episode "Hollywood"
2006	Who Killed the Electric Car?	Reporter	
2009	The Simpsons	Himself	Voice; Episode "O Brother, Where Bart Thou?"
2011	Winnie the Pooh	The Backson	Voice; final role
