= A Very Special Christmas (album) =

- Cover art by Keith Haring

Compilation album by various artists
- Released: October 12, 1987
- Genre: Christmas music, Children's music
- Length: 50:57 (Original version); 51:11 (Revised version)
- Label: A&M
- Producer: Jimmy Iovine; Roy Bittan; Eurythmics; Richard Feldman; Bruce Springsteen; Jon Landau; Chuck Plotkin; Bob Clearmountain; John Mellencamp; Don Gehman; Sting; Pete Smith; Run-D.M.C.; Steve Ett; Rick Rubin; Bob Seger; Bryan Adams; Jon Bon Jovi; Richie Sambora; Alison Moyet; Peter Oxendale

Various artists chronology
A Very Special Christmas (1987)	A Very Special Christmas 2 (1992)

Professional ratings
Review scores
Source	Rating
AllMusic	4.5/5 stars
New Musical Express	9/10

A Very Special Christmas is the first in the A Very Special Christmas series of Christmas-themed compilation albums produced to benefit the Special Olympics. The album was released on October 12, 1987, and production was overseen by Jimmy Iovine for A&M Records. A Very Special Christmas has raised millions of dollars for the Special Olympics. The cover artwork was designed by Keith Haring.

On January 16, 1998, the album was certified quadruple platinum by the Recording Industry Association of America for shipment of four million copies in the United States.

As of November 2014, A Very Special Christmas is the 19th best-selling Christmas/holiday album in the United States during the SoundScan era of music sales tracking (March 1991 – present), having sold 2,520,000 copies according to SoundScan.

== Track listing ==
No.	Title	Writer(s)	Artist	Length
1.	"Santa Claus Is Coming to Town"	John Frederick Coots and Haven Gillespie	The Pointer Sisters	3:22
2.	"Winter Wonderland"	Felix Bernard and Richard B. Smith	Eurythmics	3:36
3.	"Do You Hear What I Hear?"	Noël Regney and Gloria Shayne Baker	Whitney Houston	3:33
4.	"Merry Christmas Baby"	Lou Baxter and Johnny Moore	Bruce Springsteen and the E Street Band	4:53
5.	"Have Yourself a Merry Little Christmas^{[a]}"	Hugh Martin and Ralph Blane	The Pretenders	4:42
6.	"I Saw Mommy Kissing Santa Claus"	Tommie Connor	John Cougar Mellencamp	2:39
7.	"Gabriel's Message"	Charles Bordes and Sabine Baring-Gould	Sting	2:14
8.	"Christmas in Hollis"	Joseph Simmons, Darryl McDaniels and Jason Mizell	Run-D.M.C.	3:00
9.	"Christmas (Baby Please Come Home)"	Ellie Greenwich, Jeff Barry and Phil Spector	U2	2:21
10.	"Santa Baby"	Joan Javits, Philip Springer and Tony Springer	Madonna	2:35
11.	"The Little Drummer Boy"	Katherine Kennicott Davis, Harry Simeone and Henry Onorati	Bob Seger & the Silver Bullet Band	3:32
12.	"Run Rudolph Run"	Johnny Marks and Marvin Brodie	Bryan Adams	2:43
13.	"Back Door Santa^{[b]}"	Clarence Carter and Marcus Daniel	Bon Jovi	3:54
14.	"The Coventry Carol"	Traditional	Alison Moyet	3:25
15.	"Silent Night"	Josef Mohr and Franz X. Gruber	Stevie Nicks	4:37

Notes

- ^{^[a]}First pressings of the album contain a spoken introduction on The Pretenders' "Have Yourself a Merry Little Christmas", presumably by a child. This introduction was later omitted, shortening the track by about 13 seconds.
- ^{^[b]}Starting in 1992, "Back Door Santa" was replaced by another Bon Jovi song, "I Wish Everyday Could Be Like Christmas", which originally appeared as a B-side on their single "Keep the Faith".

== Personnel ==
According to the liner notes:

Musicians

- Bryan Adams – guitar (12)
- Kenny Aronoff – drums (6)
- Roy Bittan – piano (1, 15)
- Rupert Black – keyboards (5)
- Johnny Blitz – keyboards (12)
- Don Brewer – drums (11)
- Rosemary Butler – backing vocals (11)
- Chris Campbell – bass guitar (11)
- John Cascella – accordion (6)
- Sharon Celani – backing vocals (15)
- Clarence Clemons – saxophone (1)
- Larry Crane – guitar (6)
- Laura Creamer – backing vocals (11)
- Blair Cunningham – drums (5)
- Mickey Curry – drums (12)
- David Ervin – keyboards (11)
- Richard Feldman – drum programming and keyboards (2)
- David Freeman – guitar (1)
- Craig Frost – piano (11)
- Lisa Germano – fiddle (6)
- Donny Gerrard – backing vocals (11)
- Ms. Bobbye Hall – percussion (3)
- Richie Hayward – drums (3)
- Dorian Holley – backing vocals (11)
- Jimmy Johnson – bass guitar (3)
- Steve Jordan – drums (1)
- Charles Judge – synthesizer and string arrangements (3)
- Michael Landau – guitar (1)
- Annie Lennox – keyboards (2)
- Nils Lofgren – guitar (11)
- Darlene Love – backing vocals (3, 9)
- Steve Lukather – guitar (3)
- Robbie McIntosh – guitar (5)
- Coby Myers – bass guitar (6)
- Robbie Nevil – backing vocals (15)
- Pat Peterson – backing vocals (6)
- Darryl Phinnessee – backing vocals (11)
- Alto Reed – saxophone (11)
- Andrea Robinson – backing vocals (11)
- Keith Scott – additional guitar and backing vocal (12)
- T. M. Stevens – bass guitar (1, 5)
- Dave Stewart – drum programming (2)
- Crystal Taliefero – backing vocals (6), percussion (11)
- Dave Taylor – bass guitar (12)
- John Townsend – backing vocals (11)
- John Van Tongeren – keyboards (2)
- Rick Vito – guitar (11)
- Mike Wanchic – guitar (6)
- Waddy Wachtel – guitar (15)
- Jai Winding – piano (3)
- Edna Wright Perry – backing vocals (3)

Technical personnel

- Tom Banghart – assistant engineer (2)
- Jon Bon Jovi – arranger (13)
- Steve Boyer – assistant engineer (5)
- Joe Chiccarelli – mixing (11)
- Bob Clearmountain – mixing (1, 3–6, 9, 12, 13)
- Mark DeSisto – assistant engineer (11), additional engineering
- Peter Droll – assistant engineer (10)
- Steve Ett – engineer and mixing (8)
- Richard Feldman – engineer (2)
- John Fryer – engineer (14)
- Humberto Gatica – mixing (2, 15)
- Danny Grisgby – additional engineering
- Rob Jacobs – assistant engineer (1, 10), additional engineering
- Bruce Lampcov – engineer (5), mixing (5)
- David Leonard – engineer (6)
- Scott Litt – engineer (3, 5, 9)
- Jeremy Lubbock – arranger (10)
- Bob Ludwig – original mastering (4)
- Stephen Marcussen – mastering
- Kooster McAllister – engineer (13)
- Mark McKenna – assistant engineer (1, 3, 11), additional engineering
- Michael Morongell – assistant engineer (1)
- Alison Moyet – arranger and mixing (14)
- Dan Nash – assistant engineer (1, 15), additional engineering
- Peter Oxendale – arranger and mixing (14)
- Thom Panunzio – engineer (3, 9, 15)
- Toby Scott – engineer (4)
- Don Smith – engineer (1, 11)
- Pete Smith – engineer and mixing (7)
- Smudger – engineer (12)
- Roger Talkov – engineer (13)
- Richard Warren – arranger (15)
- Shelly Yakus – engineer (1, 10, 11, 15), mixing (10)
- Michael Young – engineer (13)

== Sales ==
Sales for "A Very Special Christmas"
Region	Certification	Certified units/sales
Canada	—	210,000
United States	—	2,520,000
