= A Very Special Christmas 2 =

1992 compilation album by various artists

- Cover art by Keith Haring

Compilation album by Various artists
- Released: October 20, 1992
- Genres: Christmas music, Children's music
- Length: 69:34
- Label: A&M
- Producers: Jimmy Iovine, Vicki Iovine, Robert Sargent Shriver

Various artists chronology
A Very Special Christmas (1987)	A Very Special Christmas 2 (1992)	A Very Special Christmas 3 (1997)

Professional ratings
Review scores
Source	Rating
Allmusic	link

A Very Special Christmas 2 is the second in the A Very Special Christmas series of Christmas-themed compilation albums produced to benefit the Special Olympics. The album was released on October 20, 1992, and production was overseen by Jimmy Iovine, Vicki Iovine and Robert Sargent Shriver for A&M Records. Tupac Shakur was supposed to be featured on the album, but due to legal trouble his song was dropped.

On December 7, 2001, A Very Special Christmas 2 was certified Double Platinum for shipment of two million copies in the United States since its 1992 release. As of November 2014, it is the 21st best-selling Christmas/holiday album in the United States during the SoundScan era of music sales tracking (March 1991 – present), having sold 2,200,000 copies according to SoundScan.

== Track listing ==
No.	Title	Writer(s)	Artist(s)	Length
1.	"Christmas All Over Again"	Tom Petty	Tom Petty and the Heartbreakers	4:15
2.	"Jingle Bell Rock"	Joe Beal and Jim Boothe	Randy Travis	4:01
3.	"The Christmas Song"	Mel Tormé and Bob Wells	Luther Vandross	4:30
4.	"Santa Claus Is Coming to Town"	John Frederick Coots and Haven Gillespie	Frank Sinatra and Cyndi Lauper	2:37
5.	"The Birth of Christ"	Nathan Morris and Shawn Stockman	Boyz II Men	2:50
6.	"Please Come Home for Christmas"	Charles Brown, Gene Redd	Jon Bon Jovi	2:53
7.	"What Christmas Means to Me"	Anna Gordy Gaye, Allen Story and George Gordy	Paul Young	2:53
8.	"O Christmas Tree"	Ernst Anschütz	Aretha Franklin	3:34
9.	"Rockin' Around the Christmas Tree"	Johnny Marks	Ronnie Spector and Darlene Love	2:49
10.	"White Christmas"	Irving Berlin	Michael Bolton	3:39
11.	"Christmas Is"	Joseph Simmons and Darryl McDaniels	Run-D.M.C.	3:19
12.	"Christmas Time Again"	Nuno Bettencourt and Gary Cherone	Extreme	5:06
13.	"Merry Christmas Baby"	Lou Baxter and Johnny Moore	Charles Brown and Bonnie Raitt	4:33
14.	"O Holy Night"	Adolphe-Charles Adam and John Sullivan Dwight	Tevin Campbell	2:46
15.	"Sleigh Ride"	Leroy Anderson and Mitchell Parish	Debbie Gibson	3:13
16.	"What Child Is This?"	Traditional	Vanessa Williams	4:10
17.	"Blue Christmas"	Billy Hayes and Jay W. Johnson	Ann and Nancy Wilson	3:48
18.	"Silent Night"	Josef Mohr and Franz X. Gruber	Wilson Phillips	3:04
19.	"I Believe in You"	Bob Dylan	Sinéad O'Connor	5:39
