= Safe in Hell =

1931 film

- Swedish theatrical release poster
- Directed by: William A. Wellman
- Screenplay by: Joseph Jackson; Maude Fulton
- Based on: A play by Houston Branch
- Starring: Dorothy Mackaill; Donald Cook
- Cinematography: Sidney Hickox
- Edited by: Owen Marks
- Production company: First National Pictures
- Distributed by: Warner Bros. Pictures
- Release date: November 26, 1931
- Running time: 73 minutes
- Country: United States
- Language: English

Safe in Hell is a 1931 American pre-Code drama film directed by William A. Wellman and starring Dorothy Mackaill and Donald Cook, with featured performances by Morgan Wallace, Ralf Harolde, Nina Mae McKinney, Clarence Muse, and Noble Johnson. The screenplay by Joseph Jackson and Maude Fulton is based on a play by Houston Branch. As a published work from 1931, the film will enter the American public domain on January 1, 2027.

== Plot ==
Gilda Karlson is a prostitute in New Orleans, accused of murdering Piet Van Saal, the man responsible for ending her former job as a secretary and leading her into prostitution. Her old boyfriend, sailor Carl Erickson, smuggles her to safety to Tortuga, an island in the Caribbean Sea from which she cannot be extradited. On the island, Gilda and Carl get "married" without a clergyman to officiate, and she swears to be faithful to him. After Carl leaves on his ship, Gilda discovers she is the only white woman in a hotel full of international criminals, all of whom try to seduce her. Especially persistent is Mr. Bruno, who describes himself as "the jailer and executioner of this island". He intercepts letters Carl sends to her and steals the support money he includes. Bruno's intention is to make Gilda think Carl has abandoned her, hoping she will seek his assistance once she becomes desperate for cash.

Later, Gilda is astonished and relieved when Van Saal suddenly arrives on the island. He explains that he had faked his death and enlisted his wife to collect on his $50,000 life-insurance policy. After receiving the money, Van Saal abandoned his wife, who then revealed his fraud to the authorities—forcing him to flee the country. Bruno, now pretending to be concerned for Gilda's safety, gives her a pistol to protect herself. When Van Saal comes to her room and attempts to rape her, Gilda shoots and kills him. She is tried for murder and seems destined for acquittal by a sympathetic jury. While awaiting the official verdict, Bruno tells her that even if she is found innocent, he will arrest her for possessing the "deadly weapon" he had given to her. The sentence will be at least six months in his prison camp, where he will provide her with very comfortable living conditions in return for sexual favors.

Gilda rushes back to the judge and falsely confesses to killing Van Saal "in cold blood", preferring to be executed rather than break her vow to Carl. As Gilda awaits her execution, she is surprised by Carl's return. He happily tells her about his new job and begins making plans for their life together back in New Orleans. Rather than telling him the truth about her circumstances, Gilda tearfully bids him goodbye and leaves him with the impression that she will join him soon. After he departs, Gilda, followed by two policemen and Bruno, slowly walks to the gallows.

== Cast ==
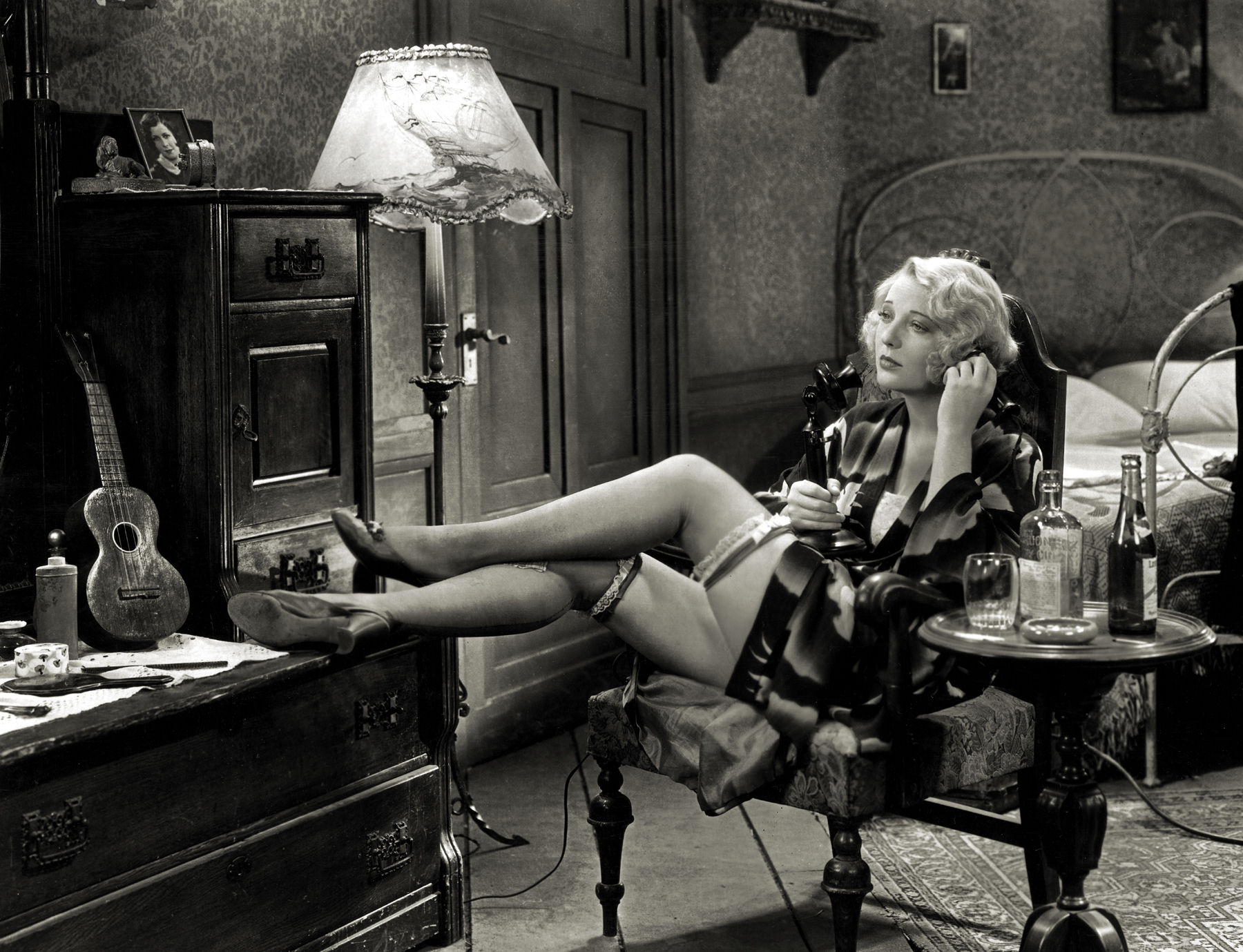
Film still of provocatively dressed Gilda (Dorothy Mackaill) as the secretary-turned-prostitute

- Dorothy Mackaill as Gilda Karlson
- Donald Cook as Carl Erickson
- Ralf Harolde as Piet Van Saal
- Morgan Wallace as Mr. Bruno, the jailer and hangman
- John Wray as Eagan
- Ivan Simpson as Crunch
- Victor Varconi as General Gomez
- Nina Mae McKinney as Leonie
- Charles Middleton as Jones, a lawyer
- Clarence Muse as Newcastle, the porter
- Gustav von Seyffertitz as Larson
- Noble Johnson as Bobo, a policeman
- Cecil Cunningham as Angie
- George F. Marion as Jack

Cast notes

- Unusual in mainstream Hollywood productions of the time, the characters portrayed by the main African-American actors in Safe in Hell—Nina Mae McKinney and Clarence Muse—are almost the "only positive and reputable" figures in the film. The two minority actors also spoke in standard American English in the film, even though their lines had been written originally in "Negro dialect". William Wellman's biographer, Frank T. Thompson, speculated that either McKinney and Muse, who were popular favorites at the time, had enough clout with the studio to avoid using a racially stereotyped style of speaking or Wellman "just wanted to avoid a convenient cliche."
- McKinney sings "When It's Sleepy Time Down South", written by Leon René, Otis René and Clarence Muse for the film.

== Production ==
Filming of Safe in Hell began in mid-September 1931 under the working titles Lady from New Orleans and Lost Lady, and it was completed in less than five weeks, "wrapping up" on October 18.

The production was originally scheduled to be directed by Michael Curtiz, and the casting of some male roles in the film initially included David Manners, Boris Karloff, John Harrington, Montague Love, and Richard Bennett. First National Pictures also considered Lilian Bond and Barbara Stanwyck for the part of Gilda.

== Release ==
Safe in Hell opened in Los Angeles on Thanksgiving Day, November 26, 1931, screening at the Warner Bros. Hollywood Theatre. It opened at New York City's Strand Theatre on December 17, 1931.

=== Home media ===
The Warner Archive Collection released the film on DVD in 2011, and on Blu-ray on April 25, 2023.

== Reception ==
Safe in Hell was publicized at the time of its release as being "Not for Children". In its December 22, 1931 review, the widely read Variety described the film's storyline as implausible and its overall tone excessively dark. The publication also noted that McKinney and Muse's performances provide the few bright spots in an otherwise "depressing" production:

Picture's story is hardboiled and sordid. Too much so most of the time, which is "Safe in Hell's" chief deficiency. Dorothy Mackaill plays a bad lady all the way to the finish, when she reforms morally while on her way to the gallows...A sad and unsatisfactory finish is obviously an attempt to lend credence to an impossible yarn. It doesn't help, for as long as the story is thoroughly unbelievable up to the finish, no ending could change that impression. Those who go for this sort of stuff won't care for the exit...Nina Mae McKinney, with one song, and Clarence Muse are the colored comedy relief, but up against too much of a handicap in the form of a constantly depressing air of evil which prevails throughout the picture.

Time was less harsh in its assessment of the film than Variety, but the weekly in its December 28, 1931 edition calls it "crude, trite, sporadically exciting." The Pittsburgh Post-Gazette disparaged the film in its February 1, 1932 issue, characterizing its plot as illogical and its presentation unintentionally humorous: "Miss Mackaill is too good for the likes of her role while the villains are acted with self-conscious bestiality and amusing indifference." The newspaper then states that McKinney's performance is "the best thing in the picture."

On the review aggregator website Rotten Tomatoes, 100% of 7 critics' reviews are positive, with an average rating of 8.3/10.

== Preservation ==
A copy of Safe in Hell is held in the Library of Congress collection.

== See also ==
- Motion Picture Production Code

== Sources ==
- Wilson, Victoria (2015). A Life of Barbara Stanwyck: Steel-True 1907-1940. New York City, New York: Simon & Schuster. ISBN 978-1-439-19406-5.
