= Class Records =

American record label (1951–1965)

- Founded: 1951
- Founder: Leon René
- Defunct: 1965
- Status: Defunct
- Country of origin: United States
- Location: Los Angeles, California

Class Records was an American record label established in Los Angeles, California, in 1951 by songwriter and record producer Leon René.

Leon René and his brother Otis had previously established and run the independent rhythm and blues labels Exclusive and Excelsior, and owned their own record pressing plant. However, when the dominant format for singles changed from 78 rpm to 45 rpm, they were unable to adjust, and the labels went out of business in 1950. Leon René then set up a new label, Class Records, installing his son, musician Rafael "Googie" René, as A&R Director.

The label's roster included singer Bobby Day, who had a hit in 1958 with "Rockin' Robin" and formed Bob & Earl with Earl Nelson. Other recording artistes included Eugene Church, Oscar McLollie, and the Googie René Combo which on recordings included many of Los Angeles' top session musicians. Leon René co-founded another new label, Rendezvous Records, in 1958. Class Records continued to release singles until 1965.
