= A Very Special Christmas Live =

1999 live album by various artists

- Cover art by Keith Haring

Live album by Various artists
- Released: October 19, 1999
- Recorded: Washington, D.C., December 1998
- Genre: Christmas music
- Length: 38:19
- Label: A&M/Interscope Records

Various artists chronology
A Very Special Christmas 3 (1997)	A Very Special Christmas Live (1999)	A Very Special Christmas 5 (2001)

Professional ratings
Review scores
Source	Rating
Allmusic	link

A Very Special Christmas Live is the fourth in the A Very Special Christmas series of Christmas music-themed compilation albums produced to benefit the Special Olympics. The album was recorded live in Washington, D.C. in December 1998 at a benefit party held by then-President Bill Clinton and First Lady Hillary Clinton to celebrate the 30th anniversary of the founding of the Special Olympics, with Whoopi Goldberg as presenter. It was released on October 19, 1999, and production was overseen by Bobby Shriver for A&M Records. It peaked at #100 in December 1999 Billboard album chart.

== Track listing ==
No.	Title	Writer(s)	Performed by	Length
1.	"Rockin' Around the Christmas Tree"	Johnny Marks	Mary J. Blige and Sheryl Crow	2:29
2.	"Christmas in Hollis"	Joseph Simmons, Darryl McDaniels, Jason Mizell	Run-D.M.C.	2:59
3.	"Please Come Home for Christmas"	Charles Brown	Jon Bon Jovi	3:13
4.	"Christmas Blues"	Roberto Hite, Adolpho de la Parra, Alan Wilson, Samuel Taylor, Henry Vestine	John Popper, Eric Clapton	3:42
5.	"What Child Is This?"	Traditional	Vanessa Williams	3:15
6.	"Christmas Tears"	Robert Charles Wilson, Sonny Thompson	Clapton	2:39
7.	"O Holy Night"	Adolphe-Charles Adam, John Sullivan Dwight	Tracy Chapman	3:26
8.	"Give Me One Reason"	Tracy Chapman	Chapman, Clapton	4:17
9.	"Merry Christmas Baby"	Lou Baxter, Johnny Moore	Crow, Clapton	3:59
10.	"Christmas (Baby Please Come Home)"	Ellie Greenwich, Jeff Barry and Phil Spector	Bon Jovi	2:53
11.	"Santa Claus Is Coming to Town"	John Frederick Coots and Haven Gillespie	Blige, Bon Jovi, Chapman, Clapton, Crow, Popper, Run-D.M.C., Williams	3:55

== Personnel ==
- Bobby Bandiera – electric guitar, backing vocals
- Tim Cappello – alto and tenor saxophones
- Tracy Chapman – acoustic guitar on "O Holy Night", electric guitar on "Give Me One Reason"
- Eric Clapton – electric guitar on "Christmas Blues", "Christmas Tears", "Give Me One Reason", "Merry Christmas Baby" and "Santa Claus Is Coming To Town"
- Michael Mancini – keyboards
- Ed Manion – baritone saxophone
- Rob Mathes – backing vocals, bass guitar on "What Child Is This?" and "Give Me One Reason"
- Shawn Pelton – drums, percussion
- Leon Pendarvis – keyboards, backing vocals
- John Popper – harmonica on "Christmas Blues" and "Santa Claus Is Coming to Town"
- Richie "La Bamba" Rosenberg – trombone, backing vocals
- Tim Smith – electric guitar on "Merry Christmas Baby", backing vocals
- Mike Spengler – trumpet
- Andy Stoller – backing vocals, bass guitar on "O Holy Night"
- Sue Williams – bass guitar
