= Exclusive Records =

- Founded: 1944
- Founder: Leon René
- Defunct: 1950
- Status: Defunct
- Genre: Jazz, blues, gospel, R&B
- Country of origin: U.S.

Exclusive Records was a record label established by Leon René, which existed from 1944 to 1950.

== History ==
Exclusive Records was established by Leon René in Los Angeles in 1944 and ceased operations in January 1950. Buddy Baker was the music director. The label's roster included music by Lucky Thompson, the Basin Street Boys, the Ceele Burke Orchestra, Edgar Hayes & His Stardusters, Herb Jeffries, Rickey Jordan, Jack McVea & His Orchestra, Mabel Scott, Frantic Fay Thomas, Joe Liggins & His Honeydrippers, and Johnny Moore's Three Blazers with Charles Brown.

Leon René and his brother Otis René, who owned Excelsior Records, purchased a shellac record pressing plant, but when the format changed from 78 rpm to 45 rpm, their old equipment could not press the new smaller vinyl discs, and both labels went out of business.

In 1951, Leon René started up Class Records with his son, musician Googie René. They formed Rendezvous Records with new partners in 1958.

== Roster ==
- Big Jay McNeely
- Buddy Baker Orchestra
- Ceele Burke Orchestra
- Charles Lind
- Dan Burley & His Skiffle Boys
- Doye O'Dell
- Edgar Hayes & His Stardusters
- Ernie Andrews
- Four Hits and a Miss
- Frances Wayne
- Frank Haywood
- "Frantic" Fay Thomas
- Gladys Watts
- Herb Jeffries
- Jack McVea & His Orchestra
- Jimmie Hudson
- Joe Liggins & His Honeydrippers
- Joe Swift (with Johnny Otis & His Orchestra)
- Johnny Moore's Three Blazers
- Les Robinson Orchestra
- Mabel Scott
- Paul Martin Orchestra
- Pete Peterson Orchestra
- Prince Cooper Trio
- Rafael Méndez Orchestra
- Red Callender Trio
- Redd Harper
- Rickey Jordan
- Smokey Hogg
- Steve Miller's Four Barons
- Texas Jim Lewis & His Lone Star Cowboys
- The Basin Street Boys
- The Dixieaires
- The Famous Ward Singers of Philadelphia
- The Gay Sisters of Chicago
- The Sallie Martin Singers
- WMA Soul Stirrers of Houston
