= Joe Liggins =

American R&B musician (1916-1987)

Background information
- Also known as: Joseph Christopher Liggins Jr.
- Born: Theodro Elliott; July 9, 1916; Seminole, Oklahoma, U.S.
- Died: July 31, 1987 (aged 71) Lynwood, California
- Genres: R&B, jump blues
- Occupations: Singer, musician, bandleader
- Instrument: Piano
- Years active: 1930s–1987
- Labels: Exclusive, Modern, Dot, Specialty

Joseph Christopher Liggins Jr. (born Theodro Elliott; July 9, 1916 – July 26, 1987) was an American R&B, jazz and blues pianist and vocalist who led Joe Liggins and his Honeydrippers in the 1940s and 1950s. His band appeared often on the Billboard magazine charts. The band's biggest hit was "The Honeydripper", released in 1945. Joe Liggins was the older brother of R&B performer Jimmy Liggins.

== Music career ==
The son of Harriett and Elijah Elliott, he was born in Seminole, Oklahoma, and took his stepfather's surname, Liggins, as a child. He apparently dropped the name Theodro and adopted the names Joseph Christopher during the 1930s. The family moved to San Diego in 1932. He graduated from Hoover High School, studied music at San Diego State College, and performed with local bands at clubs and Naval bases. He wrote arrangements on a freelance basis for Curtis Mosby’s Blue Blowers, and in 1935 Liggins joined the Creole Crusaders, which was led by the drummer Ellis Walsh.

He moved to Los Angeles in 1939, where he played with Sammy Franklin's California Rhythm Rascals and other groups. When Franklin turned down a chance to record Liggins' song "The Honeydripper", Liggins decided to start his own band. The original Joe Liggins and His Honeydrippers recordings were issued on the Exclusive Records imprint of brothers Leon and Otis René. Joe Liggins' Honeydrippers was formed in the basement of the Los Angeles home of the saxophonist Little Willie Jackson, who co-founded the group and who, at the time of his death in 2001, was the last original surviving member of the Honeydrippers. "The Honeydripper" topped the R&B chart, then called the race chart, for 18 weeks in 1945. More than 60 years later, "The Honeydripper" remains tied with Louis Jordan's "Choo Choo Ch'Boogie" for the longest-ever stay at the top of that chart. It reportedly logged two million sales.

The Honeydrippers performed at five of the Cavalcade of Jazz concerts, all of which took place at Wrigley Field in Los Angeles, and were produced by Leon Hefflin Sr. The first Cavalcade of Jazz concert was on September 23, 1945, and included Count Basie, The Peters Sisters, Slim and Bam, and Big Joe Turner to a crowd of 15,000. The second Cavalcade of Jazz concert was held on October 12, 1946, and included Jack McVea, Slim Gaillard, T-Bone Walker, Lionel Hampton and his Orchestra and Louis Armstrong. The third Cavalcade of Jazz was held on September 7, 1947, and included Woody Herman, The Valdḗs Orchestra, T-Bone Walker, Slim Gaillard, Johnny Otis and his Orchestra, Toni Harper, The Three Blazers, and Sarah Vaughan. The fourth Cavalcade of Jazz was held September 12, 1948, and included Joe Adams as Emcee, Dizzy Gillespie, Frankie Lane, Little Miss Cornshucks, the Sweethearts of Rhythm, Big Joe Turner, Jimmy Witherspoon, the Blenders and the Sensations. The seventh Cavalcade of Jazz was held on July 8, 1951, and featured Billy Eckstine, Lionel Hampton, Percy Mayfield, Jimmy Witherspoon, and Roy Brown. Joe Liggins and his Honeydrippers were on the program for more Cavalcade of Jazz concerts than any other artist. In the program description it was noted that band critics called Joe Liggins and his Original Honeydrippers, "The Hottest Little Band in the Land."

Liggins had a series of further R&B chart hits on the Exclusive label, including "Left a Good Deal in Mobile" (No. 2, 1945); "Got a Right to Cry" (No. 2, 1946); "Tanya" (No. 3, 1946); and "Blow Mr. Jackson" (No. 3, 1947). He signed with Specialty Records in 1950, where he gained more hits, including "Rag Mop" (No. 4, 1950), "Boom-Chick-A-Boogie", "Pink Champagne" (No. 1 for 13 weeks in 1950), and "Little Joe's Boogie". "Pink Champagne" also reached number 30 on the pop chart, and both "Pink Champagne" and "Got A Right To Cry" sold over one million copies and were awarded gold discs.

His songs were mostly a blend of jump blues and basic R&B. With Roy Milton, he was an architect of the small-band jump blues of the first post-war decade. Liggins often toured with such acts as Jimmy Witherspoon, Amos Milburn and the jump blues shouter H-Bomb Ferguson. In March 1954, the band took part in a benefit show held at the Club 5–4 in Los Angeles for the wife of Stan Getz.

In 1946, before the concept of rock music had been defined, Billboard described the group's song "Sugar Lump" as "right ryhthmic rock and roll music".

Although Liggins' success stopped in the late 1950s, he continued to perform until his death following a stroke, in Lynwood, California, at the age of 71.

== The Honeydrippers (band members) ==
- Little Willie Jackson – alto saxophone, baritone saxophone
- James Jackson Jr. – tenor saxophone
- Joe Liggins – piano, vocal
- Frank Pasley – guitar
- Eddie Davis – bass
- Preston "Peppy" Prince – drums

Guest session musicians:

- Joe Darensbourg – clarinet
- Johnny Moore – guitar
- Gene Phillips – guitar
- Red Callender – bass

== Discography ==
| Year | Single | Chart positions | | | |
| Year | Single | "US Retail Sales" | "US Disc Jockey" | "US Juke Box" | US R&B |
|---|---|---|---|---|---|
| 1945 | "The Honeydripper" (with The Honeydrippers) | – | – | – | 1 |
| 1945 | "Left A Good Deal In Mobile" (The Honeydrippers with Herb Jeffries) | – | – | – | 2 |
| 1946 | "Got A Right To Cry" (with The Honeydrippers) | – | – | 12 | 2 |
| 1946 | "Tanya" (with The Honeydrippers) | – | – | – | 3 |
| 1947 | "Blow Mr. Jackson" (with The Honeydrippers) | – | – | – | 3 |

=== Original 10-inch shellac (78 rpm) and 7-inch vinyl (45 rpm) releases ===
Bronze Records:

- 125 The Honeydripper, Part 1/The Honeydripper, Part 2 -1944

Exclusive Records:

- 207 The Honeydripper, Part 1 [re-recording]/The Honeydripper, Part 2 [re-recording] −1945
- 208 Left a Good Deal in Mobile (by Herb Jeffries w/Joe Liggins & His Honeydrippers)/Here's Hopin' (by Herb Jeffries Orchestra w/Homer Hall Chorus)
- 210 Got a Right to Cry/Blue Moods
- 211 Got Your Love in My Heart (by Herb Jeffries w/Joe Liggins & His Honeydrippers)/Tisco Tisco (by Pat Kay w/Herb Jeffries Orchestra)
- 212 I Know My Love Is True/Harlemesque
- 213 Lovers Lament/Miss Betty's Blues
- 216 Caravan/You Ain't Goin' to Heaven No How
- 219 Sugar Lump/Boddle-Do-Da-Deet
- 231 Breaking My Heart/Tanya
- 232 Drippers' Boogie, Part 1/Drippers' Boogie, Part 2
- 236 T.W.A./Last Night Blues
- 238 Someday Sweetheart/Yvette
- 242 Some of These Days/The Blues
- 244 The Blues/Blow Mr. Jackson
- 250 Down Home Blues/Ten Toes
- 252 Think of Me/Little Willie
- 256 Sugar/You'll Miss Me Sure's You're Born
- 258 Life Don't Mean a Thing to Me/Siboney
- 262 Worried/How Come
- 267 Groovy Groove/Apple of My Eye
- 271 Drippers' Blues/Sweet Georgia Brown
- 41x Roll 'Em/Sweet And Lovely
- 49x Spooks Holiday/The Darktown Strutters' Ball
- 61x Don't Stop Loving Me/Key Jam
- 68x Got a Right to Cry [reissue]/Blue Moods [reissue]
- 79x End of a Kiss/He Knows How to Knock Me Out
- 84x Three O'clock Jump, Part 1/Three O'clock Jump, Part 2
- 102x Miss You/Big Baritone
- 124x The Honeydripper, Part 1 [reissue]/The Honeydripper, Part 2 [reissue]
- 132x Ruth/Loosiana
- 144x Lonesome Guitar/Hey Mama
- 151x What Is the Reason (You Don't Love Me)/Ham-Bone Boogie
- 152x I Cover the Waterfront/Fascination

Modern Records:

- 20-547 58th Street Jump/On the Sunny Side of the Street
- 20-566 Black and Blue (v: Little Willie Jackson)/Jackson's Boogie
- 20-571 I Ain't Got Nobody (v: Peppy Prince)/Shasta
- 20-587 Little Willie's Boogie/You Can Depend On Me (v: Peppy Prince)
- 20-605 Someday, Somehow, Somewhere (v: Little Willie Jackson)/My Baby's Blues
- 20-613 The Peanut Vendor/Let's Jump ---note: these 12 sides were recorded by The Honeydrippers and released under the name/leadership of Little Willie Jackson.

Dot Records:

- 1031 The Honeydripper, Part 1/The Honeydripper, Part 2
- 1032 I've Got a Right to Cry/Last Night Blues
- 1033 Tanya/Down Home Blues ---note: these 6 sides are reissues of material originally recorded for Exclusive Records; Dot bought these masters and re-released them in 1951.

Specialty Records:

- 338 I've Got a Right to Cry [re-recording]/The Honeydripper [re-recording]
- 350 Rag Mop/Ramblin' Blues
- 355 Pink Champagne/Sentimental Lover
- 368 Rhythm in the Barnyard, Part 1/Rhythm in the Barnyard, Part 2
- 379 Little Joe's Boogie/Daddy on My Mind (v: Joe Liggins & Candy Rivers)
- 392 I Just Can't Help Myself/Frankie Lee
- 394 That's the One for Me (v: Joe Liggins & Candy Rivers)/Bob Is The Guy (v: Candy Rivers)
- 402 Whiskey, Gin & Wine/One Sweet Letter (v: Candy Rivers)
- 409 Louisiana Woman/Trying to Lose the Blues
- 413 So Alone/Oh, How I Miss You
- 426 Boogie Woogie Lou/Rain, Rain, Rain (v: Candy Rivers)
- 430 Tanya [re-recording]/Drippers' Boogie [re-recording]
- 441 Cryin' Over You/Going Back to New Orleans
- 453 Blues for Tanya/Freight Train Blues
- 465 Farewell Blues (v: Dell St. John)/Deep Feeling Kind of Love (v: Joe Liggins & Christine)
- 474 The Big Dipper/Everyone's Down on Me (v: Billy Bivins)
- 492 Make Love to Me/Tears on My Pillow
- 529 Whiskey, Woman & Loaded Dice/Do You Love Me Pretty Baby

Mercury Records:

- 70440 Yeah, Yeah, Yeah/They Were Doin' the Mambo [rel. 1954]

Aladdin Records:

- 3368 Justina/Go Ahead [rel. 1957]

Duplex Records:

- 1004 House Party/Tell Me So [rel. 1964]

=== Original 10-inch shellac (78 rpm) 3-disc album set ===
- 1948 Joe Liggins & His Honeydrippers (a self-titled release) [rec. 1945–1947] (Exclusive EX-1004, although not listed on jacket cover); includes the following discs:
  - 262 Worried (instrumental) [mx 1224]/How Come [mx 1226]
  - 238 Someday Sweetheart [mx 1086]/Yvette (instrumental) [mx 1087]
  - 216 Caravan (instrumental) [mx 1018]/You Ain't Goin' To Heaven No How [mx 1017]

=== LP/CD releases/compilations of note ===
- 1962 Honeydripper (Mercury MG-20731/SR-60731 [LP]) -note: re-recordings of hits.
- 1974 Great Rhythm & Blues Oldies, Volume 6: Joe Liggins & The Honeydrippers (Blues Spectrum (Johnny Otis' label) BS-106 [LP])
- 1976 Joe & Jimmy Liggins: Saturday Night Boogie Woogie Man (Sonet SNTF-5020 [LP]) -note: one side each from Joe and his brother Jimmy; all Specialty material.
- 1981 Joe Liggins & His Honeydrippers: Darktown Strutters Ball [rec. 1945–1950] (Jukebox Lil JB-601 [LP])
- 1988 Joe Liggins With the Original Million-Seller "The Honeydripper" [rec. 1945–1949] (Jukebox Lil JB-622 [LP])
- 1989 Joe Liggins & The Honeydrippers (Specialty SPCD-7006)
- 1992 Dripper's Boogie: Joe Liggins & The Honeydrippers – Vol. 2 (Specialty SPCD-7025)
- 1996 The Honeydripper: Rare And Unreleased Recordings 1946–1949 (Night Train International 7031)
- 2002 The Shuffle Boogie King (Proper Pairs PVCD-117 [2CD])
- 2002 The Chronological Joe Liggins 1944–1946 (Classics 'Blues & Rhythm Series' 5020)
- 2003 The Chronological Joe Liggins 1946–1948 (Classics 'Blues & Rhythm Series' 5063)
- 2004 The Chronological Joe Liggins 1948–1950 (Classics 'Blues & Rhythm Series' 5108)
- 2005 The Chronological Joe Liggins 1950–1952 (Classics 'Blues & Rhythm Series' 5155)
- 2008 Jukebox Hits 1945–1951 (Acrobat ACMCD-4236)
- 2016 The Joe Liggins Collection 1944–1957 (Acrobat ACTRCD-9061 [3CD])

== See also ==
- San Francisco Blues Festival
- Long Beach Blues Festival
- List of Jump blues musicians
- List of artists who reached number one on the Billboard R&B chart
- List of R&B musicians
- First rock and roll record
