= Roman Freulich =

American photographer

Roman Freulich (1898–1974) was a photographer in the United States known for his movie stills and glamour shots. He immigrated from Poland. In 1939 he directed the film The Broken Earth starring Clarence Muse. The California Digital Library has a collection of his papers. The United States Holocaust Memorial Museum in Washington, D.C. has a collection of photographs he took in Poland in 1938. Two books of his work have been published, Faces of Israel and Forty Years in Hollywood.

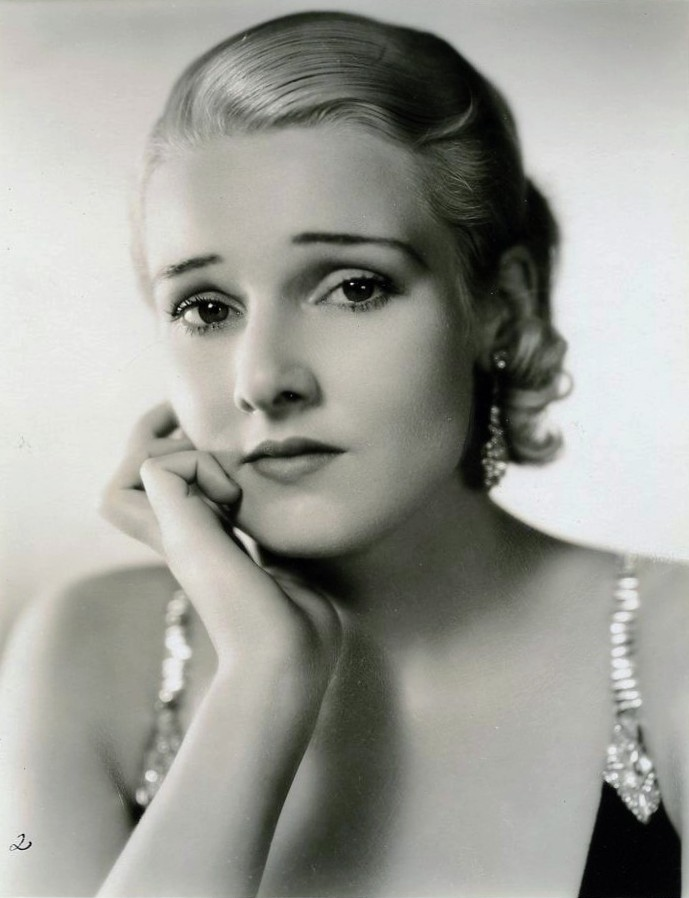
Photo of Lola Lane (1931) taken by Roman Freulich

He also shot stills for various Hollywood films including Frankenstein and The Invisible Man.

Freulich's photographs can be viewed at MPTV Images.

== Bibliography ==
- The Faces of Israel : A Photographic Commentary with Joan Abramson
- The Hill of Life with Joan Abramson, T. Yoseloff (1968)
- Forty Years in Hollywood: Portraits of a Golden Age, Castle Books, New York (1971)
