= Oscar McLollie =

- Born: Oscar Joseph Lollie; September 22, 1924; Kelly, Louisiana, United States
- Died: July 4, 2008 (aged 83) Oakland, California, United States
- Genres: Jump blues; rhythm and blues
- Occupation: Singer
- Instrument: Vocals
- Years active: Mid-1940s–c.1980s
- Labels: Mercury, Class, Modern

Oscar McLollie (born Oscar Joseph Lollie, September 22, 1924 – July 4, 2008) was an American jump blues singer.

== Biography ==
He was born in Kelly, Louisiana. He was drafted into service in World War II, and sang baritone with a vocal group, the Bullets, at USO shows. After the war he moved to Los Angeles, and sang in local jump blues bands before being recruited by Mercury Records, for a short time, as their West Coast A&R man for black music. He also recorded the song "I'm Hurt" for Mercury.

When McLollie's contract with Mercury ended, he returned to performing, and in 1953 was asked by Leon René and his son Rafael "Googie" René to record their song "The Honey Jump" for their new record label, Class. The upbeat song, with honking saxes and pounding piano, became a regional hit and was leased to Modern Records, but was covered more successfully by other artists. His follow-up, "All That Oil in Texas", was also successful locally. Oscar McLollie and his Honey Jumpers continued over the next few years to record a series of songs written by Leon or Googie René, including "God Gave Us Christmas", and "Lolly Pop" which was covered by Louis Jordan.

McLollie and his band remained popular live performers. In 1955, he recorded the ballad "Convicted", with an upbeat B-side, "Roll Hot Rod, Roll". The single, promoted by DJ Alan Freed, became McLollie's biggest seller on the Modern label and won him a slot on the Hunter Hancock TV show. However, later releases were less successful. After returning to the Class label, he achieved his only national chart success in 1958 when "Hey Girl – Hey Boy", a duet with Jeanette Baker backed by Googie René's band, reached number 61 on the Billboard pop chart. The song was also covered by Louis Prima and Keely Smith. However, it was not successfully followed up.

Later, McLollie continued to perform in cabaret in Los Angeles. Reportedly, he also spent some time in the Philippines, where he appeared in low-budget martial arts movies.

Under the name Oscar Lollie, Oscar McLollie's song "Waiting for Your Call" was track number five on B. B. King's album, One Kind Favor. This was King's 42nd and final studio album, released in August 2008, and won the Grammy Award for Best Traditional Blues Album at the 51st Grammy Awards in February 2009.

In the 1960s, Oscar Lollie met Anna Margaret McCabe in Los Angeles, California; they married and had two daughters. The family moved to Anna's hometown of Chilliwack, British Columbia. Oscar remained active as a singer, based in Canada but touring widely. Oscar and Anna divorced in the 1970s, and Oscar Lollie then returned to California.

He died in Oakland, California, in 2008.
