= A Very Special Christmas 5 =

2001 compilation album by various artists

- Cover art by Keith Haring

Compilation album by Various artists
- Released: October 30, 2001
- Genre: Christmas music
- Label: A&M/Interscope Records
- Producer: Bobby Shriver, Jon Bon Jovi, Joel Gallen

Various artists chronology
A Very Special Christmas Live (1999)	A Very Special Christmas 5 (2001)	A Very Special Acoustic Christmas (2003)

Professional ratings
Review scores
Source	Rating
Allmusic	link

A Very Special Christmas 5 is the fifth in the A Very Special Christmas series of Christmas-themed compilation albums produced to benefit the Special Olympics. Several of the album's tracks were recorded live in Washington, D.C. in December 2000 at a benefit concert hosted by then-President Bill Clinton and First Lady Hillary Clinton. The album was released on 30 October 2001, with production supervision by Bobby Shriver, Jon Bon Jovi, and Joel Gallen for A&M Records. It peaked at #112 in December 2001 Billboard album chart.

== Track listing ==
1. "This Christmas (Hang All the Mistletoe)" – Macy Gray
2. "Little Drummer Boy/Hot Hot Hot" – Wyclef Jean
3. "Noel! Noel!" – Eve 6
4. "Blue Christmas" – Jon Bon Jovi
5. "Merry Christmas Baby" – Stevie Wonder & Wyclef Jean
6. "O Come All Ye Faithful" – City High
7. "Christmas Is the Time to Say I Love You" – SR-71
8. "Christmas Day" – Dido
9. "Run Rudolph Run" – Sheryl Crow
10. "Back Door Santa" – B.B. King & John Popper
11. "Little Red Rooster" – Tom Petty & the Heartbreakers
12. "Christmas Don't Be Late (Chipmunk Song)" – Powder
13. "Silent Night" – Stevie Nicks
14. "I Love You More" – Stevie Wonder & Kimberly Brewer
15. "White Christmas" – Darlene Love
