= Spin Records =

Spin Records may refer to:

- Spin Records (Australian label), founded in 1966
- Spin Records (American label), founded in 1952
