= A Very Special Christmas 7 =

- Cover art by Keith Haring

Compilation album by Various artists
- Released: November 23, 2009
- Recorded: 2009
- Genre: Christmas
- Label: A&M/Interscope

Various artists chronology
A Very Special Acoustic Christmas (2003)	A Very Special Christmas 7 (2009)	A Very Special Christmas: 25 Years Bringing Joy to the World (2012)

A Very Special Christmas 7 is a collection of Christmas songs covered by current artists. The compilation album is the seventh in the A Very Special Christmas series of albums. The album was released on November 23, 2009, and proceeds from the sales benefited the Special Olympics.

This edition returns to the original format of including artists from a wide range of musical styles, including genres from reggae fusion (Sean Kingston) to country (Kellie Pickler). It peaked at #116 in December 2009 Billboard album chart.

== Track listing ==
1. "Have Yourself a Merry Little Christmas" by Colbie Caillat
2. "Let It Snow" by Carter Twins/Kingston
3. "Rockin' Around the Christmas Tree" by Miley Cyrus as Hannah Montana
4. "Winter Wonderland" by Vanessa Hudgens
5. "Little Drummer Boy" by Sean Kingston
6. "The Christmas Song" by Charice
7. "Do You Hear What I Hear" by Kristinia DeBarge
8. "Jingle Bell Rock" by Mitchel Musso
9. "Christmas (Baby Please Come Home)" by Leighton Meester
10. "Santa Baby" by Kellie Pickler
11. "Hark! The Herald Angels Sing" by Carrie Underwood
12. "Last Christmas" by Ashley Tisdale
13. "Silent Night" by Gloriana
14. "Winter Wonderland" by Jason Mraz (2010 re-issue)
