= Spin Records (American label) =

Spin Records was a record label jointly owned by songwriter Otis René and rhythm and blues performer and music arranger Preston Love.

== History ==
Spin Records was launched in the fall of 1952, as a joint effort between songwriter Otis René ("When It's Sleepy Time Down South") and rhythm & blues performer/saxophonist/music arranger Preston Love. The first three releases for the label were "Strange Land Blues" b/w "Cryin' For My Baby" by The Four Flames (later known as the Hollywood Flames) (with backing by the Preston Love Orchestra) on #101; "Kissin' Boogie" b/w "Jumpin' For Charles" by the Preston Love Orchestra (with vocals by Beverly Wright on A-side only) on #102; "Feel So Good" b/w "Huckle Boogie" by the Preston Love Orchestra (with vocals again by Beverly Wright on A-side only) on #103. The label is asserted to have ceased operations after these three releases. An additional release, Spin #105, was a reissue of "I'm Lost" b/w "Pitchin' Up A Boogie" by the King Cole Trio (originally released as Excelsior #104 in 1945).

All of the above-mentioned material is included on the double CD set, The Otis René Story (1942-1952), released in 2012 on V.S.O.P. Records #121 [UPC: 722937212126].
