= Way Down South (film) =

1939 film by Leslie Goodwins, Bernard Vorhaus

- Directed by: Leslie Goodwins; Bernard Vorhaus
- Written by: Clarence Muse; Langston Hughes
- Produced by: Sol Lesser
- Starring: Bobby Breen; Alan Mowbray
- Cinematography: Charles Edgar Schoenbaum
- Edited by: Arthur Hilton
- Music by: Victor Young (uncredited)
- Production company: Sol Lesser Productions
- Distributed by: RKO Radio Pictures
- Release date: July 21, 1939
- Running time: 61 minutes
- Country: United States
- Language: English

Way Down South is a 1939 American musical film directed by Leslie Goodwins and Bernard Vorhaus, and produced by Sol Lesser. It was written by Clarence Muse, who also acted in the film, and Langston Hughes. Victor Young was nominated for the Academy Award for Best Music, Scoring.

== Plot ==
In antebellum Louisiana in 1854, young orphan Timothy Reid Jr. inherits a plantation and its slaves. However, lawyer Martin Dill is made the executor of the estate. Dill plots to sell the slaves and flee to Paris with the proceeds. Timothy is befriended by Jacques Bouton, who persuades Judge Louis Ravenal to look into the matter and save the day.

== Cast ==
- Bobby Breen as Timothy Reid Jr.
- Alan Mowbray as Jacques Bouton
- Ralph Morgan as Timothy Reid Sr.
- Steffi Duna as Pauline Dubini
- Clarence Muse as Uncle Caton
- Sally Blane as Claire Bouton
- Edwin Maxwell as Martin Dill
- Charles Middleton as Cass
- Robert Greig as Judge Louis Ravenal
- Lillian Yarbo as Janie
- Matthew Beard as Gumbo
- Hall Johnson Choir as Musical Ensemble
- Willie Best as Chimney Sweep (uncredited)
- Blue Washington as Slave (uncredited)
