= Excelsior Records =

American record label (1944–1971)

Excelsior Records was an American record label established by Otis René, which existed from 1944 to 1971. It is particularly notable as having released some of the earliest recordings of Nat King Cole. It is not to be confused with former MCA and current independent record label Excelsior Recordings of The Netherlands.

== History ==
The Excelsior record label was established by Otis René in 1944, and ceased operations in original form in 1951, only to live on in a second incarnation until 1971. It is particularly notable for having released some of the first recordings by Nat King Cole. Otis René was noted to have earned $25,000 on one song in 1945, "I'm Lost", recorded by the King Cole Trio. René had written and produced the song, as well as distributed the record. Other artists on Excelsior Records included Herb Jeffries, the King Perry Orchestra, Timmie Rogers, the Flennoy Trio, Gerald Wilson & His Orchestra, the Charles Mingus Sextet, Johnny Otis & His Orchestra, the Gladys Bentley Quintet, and the Al Stomp Russell Trio.

Otis René and his brother Leon René (who owned Exclusive Records) had purchased their own shellac record pressing plant, but when the format changed from 78 rpm to 45 rpm, their old equipment could not press the new smaller vinyl discs, and both labels went out of business, only to be purchased out of bankruptcy in name only, and the label existed another 20 years by selling second and third-run pressings of recordings. In 1952, Otis started up the short-lived Spin Records with musician Preston Love.

== List of artists on Excelsior ==
- Buddy Banks Orchestra
- Eddie Beal Trio
- Gladys Bentley Quintette
- Smiley Burnette & His Rancheros
- King Cole Trio
- Herb Jeffries
- 'Memphis' Jimmy McCracklin
- Charles Mingus Sextette
- Johnny Otis and his Orchestra
- King Perry Orchestra
- Timmie Rogers
- Jimmy Rushing
- Lucky Thompson All Stars
- Big Joe Turner
- Gerald Wilson & His Orchestra

== CD compilations ==
- The Otis René Story (1942-1952) V.S.O.P. Records #121 [UPC: 722937212126] 2-CD set - note: features 44 songs from the vaults of Excelsior Records, including 9 previously unreleased tracks and demos; also includes 5 of the 6 tracks released by his short-lived Spin Records label.
