= The Broken Earth =

1939 film

- Directed by: Roman Freulich
- Starring: Clarence Muse
- Production company: Continental Pictures
- Release date: 1939
- Country: United States

The Broken Earth is an American film written and directed by Roman Freulich in 1939. The 11-minute short film stars Clarence Muse as a sharecropper and widower who plows his farm and tries to care for a sick son, pleading and praying for divine intervention. The film includes a soundtrack of negro spirituals.

Freulich was a photographer who immigrated from Poland. He shot movie stills and glamour shots, along with shooting the film with dramatic angels. The film is extant.

Muse owned a ranch that was used as a filmmaking location.

The Southern Methodist University Libraries have the film in their collection The film was screened in 2007 and discussed by Morgan State University professor Thomas Cripps.
