= A Very Special Acoustic Christmas =

Compilation album by Various artists
- Released: October 21, 2003
- Genre: Christmas music
- Label: Lost Highway Records
- Producers: Sam Bush, Buddy Cannon, Peter Collins, Emory Gordy Jr., Dann Huff, Alison Krauss, Viktor Krauss, Arif Mardin, Reba McEntire, Justin Pollard, Randy Scruggs, Ricky Skaggs, Keith Stegall, Dan Tyminski, Darrin Vincent, Rhonda Vincent, Norro Wilson

Various artists chronology
A Very Special Christmas 5 (2001)	A Very Special Acoustic Christmas (2003)	A Very Special Christmas 7 (2009)

A Very Special Acoustic Christmas is the sixth in the A Very Special Christmas series of Christmas music-themed compilation albums produced to benefit the Special Olympics. The album was released in 2003 by Lost Highway Records. As opposed to earlier editions that contained a wide variety of musical styles, this edition of A Very Special Christmas featured primarily country and bluegrass artists. It also uses cover art unique to the series, minimizing the Keith Haring artwork that serves as the series trademark. It peaked at #159 in December 2003 Billboard album chart.

Allmusic rated it 3.5 stars out of 5.

== Track listing ==
1. "Silent Night" – Reba McEntire
2. "Frosty the Snowman" – Dan Tyminski
3. "Please Come Home for Christmas" – Willie Nelson
4. "Just Put a Ribbon in Your Hair" – Alan Jackson
5. "Only You Can Bring Me Cheer (Gentleman's Lady)" – Alison Krauss
6. "Even Santa Claus Gets the Blues" – Marty Stuart
7. "Jingle Bells" – Earl Scruggs
8. "Christmas Is Near" – Ralph Stanley
9. "O Come All Ye Faithful" – Patty Loveless
10. "O Holy Night" – Wynonna Judd
11. "Winter Wonderland" – Pat Green
12. "Let It Snow, Let It Snow, Let It Snow" – Sam Bush
13. "Away in a Manger" – Ricky Skaggs
14. "Christmas Time at Home" – Rhonda Vincent
15. "I'll Be Home for Christmas" – Tift Merritt
16. "Peace" – Norah Jones

== Release history ==
Year	Label	Format	Catalog
2003	Lost Highway	CD	000103802

== Chart performance ==
Chart (2003)	Peak position
U.S. Billboard Top Country Albums	24
