= A Very Special Christmas =

Benefit compilation album series

The cover artwork by Keith Haring that is used in some form, with varying color schemes, on all A Very Special Christmas albums.

A Very Special Christmas is the title of a series of Christmas music compilation albums that benefit the Special Olympics. It features songs performed by artists from a variety of genres, such as Dave Matthews, U2, Stevie Nicks, Bon Jovi, Madonna, The Smashing Pumpkins, No Doubt, Whitney Houston, Run–D.M.C., Jason Mraz, Willie Nelson, Bruce Springsteen and Tom Petty and the Heartbreakers.

A Very Special Christmas was the idea of music producer Jimmy Iovine, who wanted to produce a Christmas album as a memorial to his father. The idea of the record benefiting the Special Olympics was suggested by Iovine's wife Vicki, as she was a volunteer for the organization. Herb Alpert and Jerry Moss, the founders of A&M Records, along with Bobby Shriver, helped the Iovines realize the project. As of 2012, the series had raised over $100 million for the Special Olympics.

All of the albums use the same cover art: a simplistic line drawing of a person holding a baby (an abstract representation of Mary holding baby Jesus) by Keith Haring in his usual style. Each album uses the artwork with a different color scheme.

== A Very Special Christmas series ==
- A Very Special Christmas 1 (A&M Records, 1987)
- A Very Special Christmas 2 (A&M Records, 1992)
- A Very Special Christmas 3 (A&M Records, 1997)
- A Very Special Christmas Live from Washington, D.C. (A&M Records, 1999)
- A Very Special Christmas 5 (A&M Records, 2001)
- A Very Special Acoustic Christmas (Lost Highway Records, 2003)
- A Very Special Christmas 7 (A&M Records/UM^{e}, 2009)
- A Very Special Christmas: 25 Years Bringing Joy to the World (Big Machine Records, 2012)
- A Very Special Christmas: Bringing Peace on Earth (Word Records/Curb Records, 2012)
- ICON: A Very Special Christmas (A&M Records/UM^{e}, 2013)
