= A Very Special Christmas 3 =

- Cover art by Keith Haring

Compilation album by Various artists
- Released: September 23, 1997
- Genre: Christmas music
- Length: 66:32
- Label: A&M
- Producers: Bobby Shriver, Al Cafaro, Linda Feder

Various artists chronology
A Very Special Christmas 2 (1992)	A Very Special Christmas 3 (1997)	A Very Special Christmas Live (1999)

Professional ratings
Review scores
Source	Rating
Allmusic	link

A Very Special Christmas 3 is the third in the A Very Special Christmas series of Christmas-themed compilation albums produced to benefit the Special Olympics. The album was released on September 23, 1997, and production was overseen by Bobby Shriver, Al Cafaro, and Linda Feder for A&M Records.

== Track listing ==
No.	Title	Writer(s)	Artist(s)	Length
1.	"I Saw Three Ships"	Traditional	Sting	1:45
2.	"Christmastime"	Billy Corgan	The Smashing Pumpkins	3:18
3.	"Children Go Where I Send Thee"	Traditional	Natalie Merchant	5:14
4.	"Santa Baby"	Joan Javits, Lauryn Hill, Tony Springer, Michel Prakazrel, Philip Springer and Wyclef Jean	Rev Run and the Christmas All-Stars featuring Mase, Puff Daddy, Snoop Doggy Dogg, Salt-n-Pepa, Onyx and Keith Murray	4:04
5.	"Oi to the World"	Joe Escalante	No Doubt (The Vandals cover)	2:42
6.	"Blue Christmas"	Billy Hayes and Jay W. Johnson	Sheryl Crow	3:34
7.	"Christmas"	Ernest Anastasio and John Popper	Blues Traveler	5:45
8.	"Oíche Chiún"	Josef Mohr and Franz X. Gruber	Enya	3:48
9.	"The Christmas Song"	Mel Tormé and Bob Wells	Hootie & the Blowfish	3:14
10.	"Ave Maria"	Natasha Shneider and Franz Schubert	Chris Cornell with Eleven	6:12
11.	"Christmas in the City"	Mary J. Blige, Malik Pendleton and Angie Martinez	Mary J. Blige featuring Angie Martinez	4:38
12.	"Santa Claus Is Back in Town"	Jerry Leiber and Mike Stoller	Jonny Lang	4:20
13.	"Christmas Song"	Dave Matthews	Dave Matthews and Tim Reynolds	5:15
14.	"Christmas Is Now Drawing Near at Hand"	Traditional	Steve Winwood	2:32
15.	"O Holy Night"	Adolphe-Charles Adam and John Sullivan Dwight	Tracy Chapman	4:30
16.	"We Three Kings"	Traditional	Patti Smith	5:47

== Charts ==
=== Weekly charts ===
Chart (1997)	Peak position
US Billboard 200	31
US Top Holiday Albums (Billboard)	2

=== Year-end charts ===
Chart (1998)	Position
US Billboard 200	200

== Certifications ==
Region	Certification	Certified units/sales
United States (RIAA)	Gold	500,000^{^}
^{^} Shipments figures based on certification alone.
