= Little Willie Jackson =

American jazz musician

Willie E. Jackson Jr. (September 9, 1912 – February 13, 2001), known as Little Willie Jackson, was an American jazz and rhythm and blues saxophonist, bandleader and occasional vocalist.

== Life and career ==
Jackson was born in Houston, Texas. He was blind, and took up the saxophone and clarinet. By the mid 1930s he was based in San Diego, California, where he played with pianist Joe Liggins in the Creole Serenaders. He and Liggins then moved to Los Angeles, and in the early 1940s they formed the Honeydrippers, a band that took its name from the song "The Honeydripper", which became a number one R&B hit in 1945. Jackson was credited with both alto and baritone saxophone on the recording. Jackson also occasionally sang with the Honeydrippers, as on the 1946 single "Walkin'".

Jackson recorded several tracks as bandleader with the Honeydrippers, for Modern Records in 1947, when the company needed to record material to issue during the 1948 American Federation of Musicians recording ban. According to critic Richie Unterberger, they "straddled the line between the swing and jump blues eras, with a hefty dose of boogie... [but] Jackson was closer to jazz (and further removed from blues) than most..." Several of his recordings were versions of jazz songs first recorded in the 1920s or earlier, such as "I Ain't Got Nobody," and "St. Louis Blues," often in a style similar to Cab Calloway.

Jackson continued to perform with Liggins and to record occasionally in the 1950s and 1960s, though the band's style became outmoded with the advent of rock and roll. His final recordings were in 1969, with Liggins on tracks recorded for Johnny Otis' Blues Spectrum label. In 1983, Jackson appeared with Liggins at a "Legends of Rhythm & Blues" show recorded for TV in Los Angeles.

A compilation of Jackson's recordings for Modern was issued by Ace Records in 2000. He died in Los Angeles in 2001.

== Albums/CDs ==
- Jazz Me Blues (The Legendary Modern Recordings) (Ace #CDCHD-749, 2000)
