= Someone's Rocking My Dreamboat =

1941 song

Single by The Ink Spots
- A-side: "Nothin'"
- Written: 1941
- Published: 1941
- Released: November 1941
- Recorded: October 13, 1941
- Genre: Traditional pop
- Length: 3:17
- Label: Decca
- Songwriters: Leon René, Otis René, Emerson Scott

"Someone's Rocking My Dreamboat" is a song written by Leon René, Otis René and Emerson Scott in 1941.

It was recorded in 1941 by The Ink Spots (Decca 4045), Erskine Hawkins (Bluebird B-11277), "Hutch" Leslie Hutchinson with Orchestra (HMV B.D.1006), and The Four Tones & Eddie Beal Trio (Make Believe Ballroom AM 02357-E).

It was first heard in a feature film in Bullet Scars (1942). It was also heard in 1942 in Juke Girl and Wings for the Eagle. 1942 also saw versions of the song released by bandleaders Shep Fields, Benny Goodman, Woody Herman, and Artie Shaw.

== Cultural influence ==
The song was a favorite of Warner Bros. animators, appearing in at least eight WB cartoons, between 1942 and 1952. They included Crazy Cruise (1942), The Squawkin' Hawk (1942), A Tale of Two Kitties (1942), Bugs Bunny Nips the Nips (1944), The Big Snooze (1946), Roughly Squeaking (1946), Gorilla My Dreams (1948), and Kiddin' the Kitten (1952). Experimental filmmaker Kenneth Anger made a juvenile film in 1941 titled Who Has Been Rocking My Dreamboat.
