= A Very Special Christmas: 25 Years Bringing Joy to the World =

2012 album by various artists

Compilation album by Various artists
- Released: October 16, 2012
- Genre: Christmas music
- Length: 60:55
- Label: Big Machine Records
- Producer: Bobby Shriver, Al Cafaro, Linda Feder

Various artists chronology
A Very Special Christmas 7 (2009)	A Very Special Christmas: 25 Years Bringing Joy to the World (2012)	A Very Special Christmas: Bringing Peace on Earth (2012)

Professional ratings
Review scores
Source	Rating
AllMusic	2.5/5 stars

A Very Special Christmas: 25 Years Bringing Joy to the World is the eighth in the A Very Special Christmas series of Christmas music-themed compilation albums produced to benefit the Special Olympics. The album was released on October 16, 2012. It peaked at #61 in December 2012 Billboard album chart.

== Track listing ==
Track	Song title	Artist	Time
1.	"Joy to the World"	Train	3:59
2.	"Something in the Air (2012 Coca-Cola Christmas Anthem)"	Grayson Sanders and Jono featuring Lauriana Mae	3:13
3.	"Angels We Have Heard On High"	Jewel	4:10
4.	"It's Beginning to Look a Lot Like Christmas"	Michael Bublé	3:26
5.	"Do You Hear What I Hear?"	Jordin Sparks	3:31
6.	"I Want You For Christmas"	Cheap Trick	4:06
7.	"Mary, Did You Know?"	Rascal Flatts	3:15
8.	"Best Christmas Ever"	Wonder Girls	3:56
9.	"Tennessee Christmas"	Amy Grant	4:31
10.	"Christmas Without You"	OneRepublic	3:15
11.	"Breath of Heaven (Mary's Song)"	Vince Gill	5:57
12.	"Please Come Home For Christmas"	Martina McBride	2:52
13.	"Winter Wonderland"	Jason Mraz	2:06
14.	"December 25"	Francesca Battistelli	2:42
15.	"Christmas Song (Live on 9/18/10 in Chicago)"	Dave Matthews Band	5:08
16.	"Oh Holy Night"	Christina Aguilera	4:48
