= King Perry =

American jazz saxophonist and clarinetist (1914–1990)

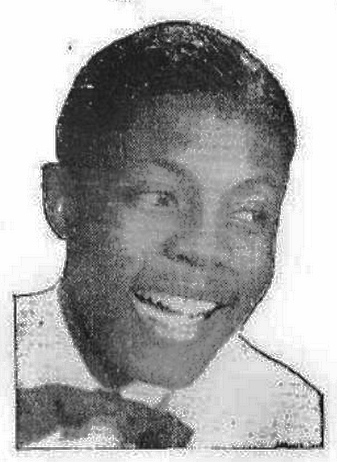
- Born: Oliver Hazart; October 10, 1914; Forrest City, Arkansas, United States
- Died: February 5, 1990 (aged 75); Bakersfield, California, United States

Oliver Hazart "King" Perry (October 10, 1914 – February 5, 1990) was an American jazz saxophonist, clarinetist, arranger, and bandleader.

== Biography ==
Perry was born in Forrest City, Arkansas, United States. He played violin as a child, but switched to alto saxophone, after witnessing Johnny Hodges playing with Duke Ellington's Orchestra, and then wishing to join a local band. He attended Starr College in West Virginia, studying piano there, and had his own band in Gary, Indiana, by 1940. In 1945, he relocated to Los Angeles, appearing in a show with Dorothy Donegan and Nat King Cole; while there he made his first recordings in July that year as a leader. He led a band called the Pied Pipers through the middle of the 1950s, making many records and touring across the United States multiple times (as well as Canada in 1951). He recorded for Melodisc, United Artists, Excelsior, De Luxe, Specialty, Dot, RPM, Lucky, Unique, Look, and Hollywood during this period. After ca. 1954 Perry went into a hiatus from music, but returned to play after moving to Bakersfield in 1967. In the 1970s, he played as a one-man band with organ, saxophone, and percussion. Around this time he also released a number of comedy albums for his own label, Octive.

He later moved into selling real estate. He died in Bakersfield, California, aged 75.
