= "Frantic" Fay Thomas =

Background information
- Born: Fannie Crawford; Memphis, Tennessee, U.S.
- Died: July 6, 1978 (aged 55) Detroit, Michigan, U.S.
- Genre: Jazz
- Occupations: Musician
- Instruments: Piano
- Label: Exclusive

Fannie "Frantic Fay" Crawford Thomas (September 14, 1922 – July 6, 1978) She was an American pianist and vocalist. She recorded for Exclusive Records in 1949.

== Life and career ==
Thomas was born Fannie Crawford in Memphis, Tennessee. As a teenager, her family moved to Detroit, Michigan. Her father Elijah Crawford and her brother Bayless Crawford were cooks. On March 12, 1940, she married George Thomas in Cleveland, Ohio.

Thomas began performing at Detroit's Four Horsemen Club in 1940. She was discovered by Earl Carroll, who gave her the stage name "Frantic Fay." Thomas was featured with Earl Carroll's Vanities in the spring of 1944 and played eight months at Harry's Show Bar in Detroit. She was managed by Delbridge & Gorrell. Thomas played piano by ear. Billboard magazine described her style as "individual, with a jive touch," adding that "she is at her very best in an interpretation of the deep blues." Through the 1940s, she had appearances at hotels and bars around Detroit and the West Coast.

In 1949, Thomas recorded four songs for Leon René's Exclusive Records in Los Angeles: "I'm In Town," "Waga-Waga," "I Don't Want Your Money, Honey," and "Lover Man." Her first single "Waga-Waga" / "I Don't Want Your Money, Honey," was released in June 1949. Reviewing the single, Billboard wrote: "New thrush-88er packs a dynamite live style with something of Rose Murphy and Nellie Lutcher and plenty of her own. Her piano work is of pro caliber, too." The record "I Don't Want Your Money, Honey" was Cash Box magazine's Race Disk O' The Week. They noted that track was a "surefire clickeroo if ever there was one. Jut listen to this gal skim thru the 88's and gurgle, chuckle, giggle and sing, and make more sounds than you've heard in a month of Sundays." The single did well in local markets, but it did not chart nationally. Her second single, "I'm In Town" / "Lover Man," was released in September 1949. Later that year, Thomas had another session with Exclusive and recorded four more songs. The single "Thinking Of You" / "I Lost My Sugar In Salt Lake City" was released in December. That month, Exclusive declared bankruptcy and ceased operations in January 1950. Thomas never released another record.

In the 1950s, Thomas performed gigs at various venues around the United States. She married Lonnie I. Riggs in 1954. By the 1960s, Thomas had relocated back to Detroit; and she continued to perform around the Midwest. She died in Detroit on July 6, 1978. Years after her death, Thomas' songs were featured in the soundtracks of a few movies. "I'm In Town" was used in the films Men Of Honor (2000), Lonely Hearts (2006), and Trumbo (2015). One of her unreleased Exclusive tracks, "I Only Want You" was used in the films Lovelife (1997) and Second Skin (2000).

== Discography ==
- 1949: "Waga-Waga" / "I Don't Want Your Money, Honey" (Exclusive 109x)
- 1949: "I'm In Town" / "Lover Man" (Exclusive 126x)
- 1949: "Thinking Of You" / "I Lost My Sugar In Salt Lake City" (Exclusive 145x)
