= When It's Sleepy Time Down South =

Single by Louis Armstrong and His Orchestra
- B-side: "When Your Lover Has Gone"
- Released: November 1931
- Recorded: April 20, 1931
- Genre: Jazz; Swing
- Length: 3:15
- Label: Parlophone
- Songwriters: Clarence Muse; Leon René; Otis René

Louis Armstrong singles chronology
"Song of the Islands" / "Blue Turning Grey Over You" (1930)	"When It's Sleepy Time Down South" (1931)	"Laughin' Louie" / "Tomorrow Night" (1933)

"When It's Sleepy Time Down South", also known as "Sleepy Time Down South", is a 1931 jazz song written by Clarence Muse, Leon René and Otis René. It was sung in the 1931 movie Safe in Hell by Nina Mae McKinney, and became the signature song of Louis Armstrong, who recorded it almost a hundred times during his career. The song is now considered a jazz standard and it has been recorded by a plethora of artists. A popular recording in 1931 was by Paul Whiteman and his Orchestra (vocal by Mildred Bailey).

== History ==
Al Hirt released a version on his 1963 album, Our Man in New Orleans, and Harry James released a version on his 1972 album Mr. Trumpet (Longines Symphonette Society SYS 5459/LS 217C/LS 217U). A British cover version was released in 1932 by Bob and Alf Pearson.

Bing Crosby recorded the song in 1975 for his album A Southern Memoir.

The lyrics concern the Great Migration in the United States, the movement of African Americans from the South to cities in the North, with the singer talking about the "dear old Southland... where I belong", and contain many racial stereotypes. Armstrong's popularity among African-American audiences dropped because of the song, but at the same time it helped the trumpeter to make his fan base broader. In protest during the 1950s, African Americans burned their copies of the song, which forced Armstrong to re-evaluate and change the song's lyrics in a reissue. There is a 1942 film short of the song where Armstrong and others played slaves and farm workers.

== See also ==
- List of 1930s jazz standards
