= Kingston (duo) =

American country music duo

- Also known as: Carter Twins
- Origin: Hudson, Ohio, United States
- Genre: Country
- Years active: 2008–2012
- Label: CMT Music/Meteor 17
- Past members: Joshua Scott Carter; Zachary Edward Carter

Kingston was an American country music duo consisting of twin brothers, Joshua Scott Carter and Zachary Edward Carter. Until September 2011, Kingston was known as the Carter Twins and released their debut single, "Heart Like Memphis", on March 16, 2009.

== Biography ==
Kingston grew up in Hudson, Ohio, and were surrounded by music from the time they were born. Their mother worked in country radio and encouraged their interest. Zach stole time at her piano, while she taught Josh “Stairway to Heaven” on the guitar. In 2008, the Carter Twins scored a chance meeting with executive in Los Angeles, who ultimately led them to CMT. The brothers completed high school and moved to Nashville, Tennessee to pursue their music career full-time under the development of CMT Music, as the first act on the new label.

Their debut single with the CMT Music label was released in March 2009, and reached a peak of number 54 on the U.S. Billboard Hot Country Songs. They were reported to having been working on their self-titled debut album with producer Frank Rogers, with an expected release date of August 2009, although it was never released. The duo wrote over 80 songs for the album, including co-writes from the members of Lady Antebellum. Ultimately, however, it was announced on September 22, 2009 that the Carter Twins had parted ways with CMT.

Although their self-titled debut album was never released, the duo released a 4-song digital EP titled Carter Twins on November 3, 2009. The EP features their single "Heart Like Memphis."

In September 2011, the duo posted a YouTube video announcing the duo's name change to Kingston.

== Band ==
- Mark Trussell - Electric guitar
- Brian Howell - Bass guitar
- Tommy Perkinson - Drums

== Discography ==
=== Extended plays ===
Title	Album details
Carter Twins	Release date: November 3, 2009; Label: Meteor 17; Formats: Music download

=== Singles ===
Year	Single	Peak positions	Album
Year	Single	US Country	Album
2009	"Heart Like Memphis"	54	Carter Twins

=== Music videos ===
Year	Video	Director
2009	"Heart Like Memphis"	Eric Welch
2009	"So What"	Kathryn Russ
2009	"Let It Snow! Let It Snow! Let It Snow!"	Kristin Barlowe
2012	"Dear Someone"	
