= Clarence Muse =

American actor (1889–1979)

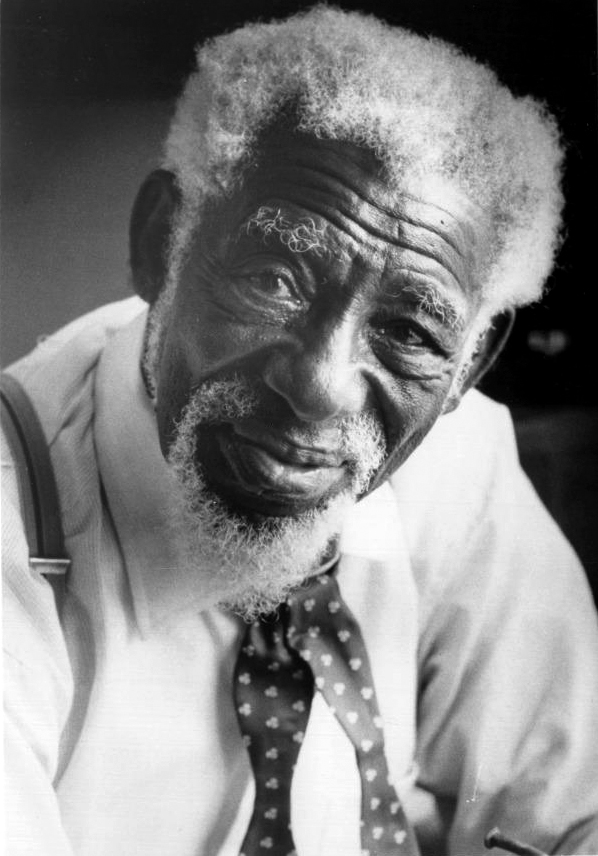
- Muse in 1978
- Born: October 14, 1889; Baltimore, Maryland, U.S.
- Died: October 13, 1979 (aged 89); Perris, California, U.S.
- Education: Dickinson College
- Occupations: Actor; screenwriter; director; singer; composer
- Years active: 1921–1979
- Spouses: Willabelie (m. 1925; div. 1948); Irene Ena (m. 1952)
- Children: 3

Clarence Muse (October 14, 1889 – October 13, 1979) was an American actor, screenwriter, director, singer, and composer. He was the first African American to appear in a starring role in a major studio film, 1929's Hearts in Dixie. He acted for 50 years, and appeared in more than 150 films. He was inducted into the Black Filmmakers Hall of Fame in 1973.

== Life and career ==
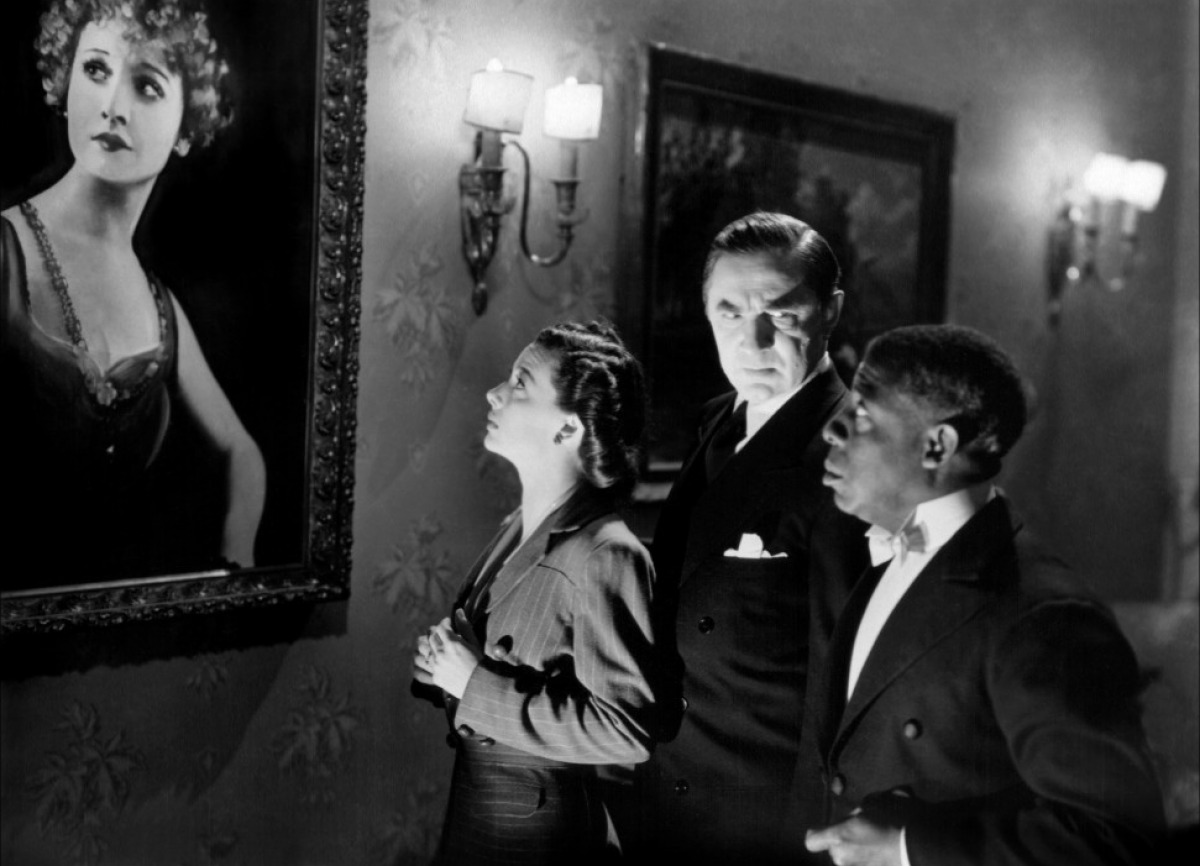
Polly Ann Young, Bela Lugosi, and Clarence Muse in Invisible Ghost (1941)

Muse was born in Baltimore, Maryland, the son of Alexander and Mary Muse. He studied at Dickinson School of Law in Carlisle, Pennsylvania, for one year in 1908, but left because he believed he could not make a living in the profession as an African American. A member of the Phi Beta Sigma fraternity, he later received an honorary doctor of humanities from Bishop College in Dallas, Texas, in 1972, and an honorary doctorate of laws from Dickenson in 1978.

By the 1920s Muse was acting in New York during the Harlem Renaissance with two Harlem theatres, Lincoln Players and Lafayette Players. While with the Lafayette Players, Muse worked under the management of producer Robert Levy on productions that helped black actors to gain prominence and respect. In regards to the Lafayette Theatre's staging of Dr. Jekyll and Mr. Hyde, Muse said the play was relevant to black actors and audiences "because, in a way, it was every black man's story. Black men too have been split creatures inhabiting one body.".

Muse moved to Chicago for a while, and then moved to Hollywood. He performed in Hearts in Dixie (1929), the first all-black movie. For the next fifty years, he worked regularly in minor and major roles. Muse appeared as an opera singer, minstrel show performer, vaudeville and Broadway actor; he also wrote songs, plays, and sketches. In 1943, he became the first African-American Broadway director with Run Little Chillun.

Muse was also the co-writer of several notable songs. In 1931, with Leon René and Otis René, Muse wrote "When It's Sleepy Time Down South", also known as "Sleepy Time Down South". The song was sung by Nina Mae McKinney in the movie Safe in Hell (1931). Later it became a signature song of Louis Armstrong.

He was the major star in The Broken Earth (1936), which related the story of a black sharecropper whose son miraculously recovers from fever through the father's fervent prayer. Shot on a farm in the South with nonprofessional actors (except for Muse), the film's early scenes focused in a highly realistic manner on the physical labor of plowing scenes with black farmers. In 1938, Muse co-starred with boxer Joe Louis in Spirit of Youth, the fictional story of a champion boxer, which featured an all-black cast. Muse and Langston Hughes wrote the script for Way Down South (1939) whose title was taken from Muse's 1932 memoir, coauthored with David Arlen.

Muse performed in Broken Strings (1940), as a concert violinist who opposes the desire of his son to play "swing". During World War II, Muse performed for the USO, including a Negro USO in Riverside, California. From 1955 to 1956, Muse was a regular on the weekly TV version of Casablanca, playing Sam the pianist (a part he had been considered for in the original Warner Brothers film). In 1959, he played Peter, the Honey Man, in the film musical Porgy and Bess.

Muse appeared on Disney's TV miniseries The Swamp Fox. Other film credits include Buck and the Preacher (1972), The World's Greatest Athlete (1973), Car Wash (1976), and Passing Through. His last acting role was in The Black Stallion (1979).

== Death ==
Muse died in Perris, California, on October 13, 1979, one day before his 90th birthday and on the same day that his final film was released.

== Partial filmography ==
- Election Day (1929, short) as Farina's father
- Hearts in Dixie (1929) as Nappus
- Hallelujah (1929) as Church Member (uncredited)
- Guilty? (1930) as Jefferson
- A Royal Romance (1930) as Rusty
- Honey (1930) as Black Revivalist (uncredited)
- Swing High (1930) as Singer (uncredited)
- Rain or Shine (1930) as Nero
- The Thoroughbred (1930) as Stablehand (uncredited)
- Outside the Law (1930) as Party Guest (uncredited)
- Derelict (1930) as Driver (uncredited)
- Deep South (1930)
- The Last Parade (1931) as Alabam' / Singing Voice of Condemned Man (uncredited)
- Dirigible (1931) as Clarence
- The Fighting Sheriff (1931) as Curfew
- Huckleberry Finn (1931) as Jim
- Secret Service (1931) as Jonas Polk
- Safe in Hell (1931) as Newcastle – the Porter
- The Secret Witness (1931) as Jeff – Building Janitor
- X Marks the Spot (1931) as Eustace Brown
- The Woman from Monte Carlo (1932) as Tombeau
- Prestige (1932) as Nham
- The Wet Parade (1932) as Taylor Tibbs
- Lena Rivers (1932) as Curfew
- Night World (1932) as Tim Washington, the Doorman
- Attorney for the Defense (1932) as Jeff
- Is My Face Red? (1932) as Horatio
- Winner Take All (1932) as Rosebud, the Trainer
- White Zombie (1932) as Coach Driver (uncredited)
- Big City Blues (1932) as Nightclub Singer (uncredited)
- Blonde Venus (1932) as Charlie, the Bartender
- Hell's Highway (1932) as Rascal
- The Cabin in the Cotton (1932) as A Blind Negro
- Washington Merry-Go-Round (1932) as Clarence
- Man Against Woman (1932) as Smoke Johnson
- If I Had a Million (1932) as Death Row Singing Prisoner (uncredited)
- The Death Kiss (1932) as Shoeshine Man (uncredited)
- Frisco Jenny (1932) as Singer (voice, uncredited)
- Laughter in Hell (1933) as Abraham Jackson
- From Hell to Heaven (1933) as Sam – Bellhop
- The Mind Reader (1933) as Sam
- The Life of Jimmy Dolan (1933) as Masseur (uncredited)
- Melody Cruise (1933) as Dock Worker (uncredited)
- The Wrecker (1933) as Chauffeur
- Fury of the Jungle (1933) as Sunrise
- Flying Down to Rio (1933) as Caddy in Haiti (uncredited)
- Massacre (1934) as Sam
- A Very Honorable Guy (1934) as Black Man (uncredited)
- The Personality Kid (1934) as Shamrock
- Operator 13 (1934) as Slave at Medicine Show (uncredited)
- Black Moon (1934) as 'Lunch' McClaren
- The Count of Monte Cristo (1934) as Ali
- Kid Millions (1934) as Native (uncredited)
- Broadway Bill (1934) as Whitey
- Red Hot Tires (1935) as Bud's Truck Partner
- Alias Mary Dow (1935) as 'Rufe'
- So Red the Rose (1935) as Cato
- After the Dance (1935) as Cook (uncredited)
- Harmony Lane (1935) as Old Joe
- The Public Menace (1935) as Janitor (uncredited)
- O'Shaughnessy's Boy (1935) as Jeff
- East of Java (1935) as First Mate Johnson
- Muss 'em Up (1936) as William
- Laughing Irish Eyes (1936) as Deacon
- Show Boat (1936) as Janitor
- The Green Pastures (1936) as Angel (uncredited)
- Spendthrift (1936) as Restaurant Table Captain (uncredited)
- Follow Your Heart (1936) as Choir Leader (uncredited)
- Daniel Boone (1936) as Pompey
- The Broken Earth (1936), a short, extant
- Mysterious Crossing (1936) as Lincoln
- High Hat (1937) as Congo MacRosenbloom
- Jungle Menace (1937) as Lightning – Street Singer
- Deep South (1937, Short)
- Spirit of Youth (1938, also music) as Frankie Walburn
- The Toy Wife (1938) as Brutus
- Prison Train (1938) as Train Steward / Sam
- Secrets of a Nurse (1938) as Tiger
- Way Down South (1939, also writer) as Uncle Caton
- Zanzibar (1940) as Bino
- Sporting Blood (1940) as Jeff
- Maryland (1940) as Rev. Bitters (uncredited)
- That Gang of Mine (1940) as Ben
- Murder Over New York (1940) as Butler
- Chad Hanna (1940) as Henry Prince (uncredited)
- Adam Had Four Sons (1941) as Sam
- The Flame of New Orleans (1941) as Samuel
- Invisible Ghost (1941) as Evans
- Love Crazy (1941) as Robert
- Kisses for Breakfast (1941) as Old Jeff
- Gentleman from Dixie (1941) as Jupe
- Belle Starr (1941) as Bootblack in Saloon (uncredited)
- Among the Living (1941) as Riverbottom Cafe Waiter (uncredited)
- Twin Beds (1942) as George (uncredited)
- Tough As They Come (1942) as Eddie
- Tales of Manhattan (1942) as Grandpa (Robeson sequence)
- The Talk of the Town (1942) as Supreme Court Doorkeeper (uncredited)
- Sin Town (1942) as Train Porter (uncredited)
- Broken Strings (1942) as Arthur Williams
- Strictly in the Groove (1942) as Durham's Valet (uncredited)
- The Black Swan (1942) as Margaret's Servant (uncredited)
- Shadow of a Doubt (1943) as Pullman Porter
- Sherlock Holmes in Washington (1943) as George – Porter (uncredited)
- The Sky's the Limit (1943) as Colonial Club Doorman (uncredited)
- Honeymoon Lodge (1943) as Porter (uncredited)
- Heaven Can Wait (1943) as Jasper, Strabel's Butler (uncredited)
- Watch on the Rhine (1943) as Horace
- Johnny Come Lately (1943) as Butler
- Flesh and Fantasy (1943) as Jeff (uncredited)
- The Racket Man (1944) as George (uncredited)
- Jam Session (1944) as Henry
- Follow the Boys (1944) as Singer (uncredited)
- Stars on Parade (1944) as Carter (uncredited)
- Double Indemnity (1944) as Man (uncredited)
- The Soul of a Monster (1944) as Entertainer (uncredited)
- In the Meantime, Darling (1944) as Henry – Hotel Porter (uncredited)
- San Diego, I Love You (1944) as Porter (uncredited)
- Jungle Queen (1945) as Kyba
- God Is My Co-Pilot (1945) as Frank (uncredited)
- Without Love (1945) as Porter (uncredited)
- Boston Blackie's Rendezvous (1945) as Hotel Porter (uncredited)
- She Wouldn't Say Yes (1945) as Porter (uncredited)
- Scarlet Street (1945) as Ben – Bank Janitor (uncredited)
- The Thin Man Goes Home (1945) as Porter on Train (uncredited)
- Two Smart People (1946) as Porter
- Night and Day (1946) as Porter (uncredited)
- Affairs of Geraldine (1946) as Porter (uncredited)
- My Favorite Brunette (1947) as Second Man on Death Row (uncredited)
- A Likely Story (1947) as Porter (uncredited)
- Welcome Stranger (1947) as Clarence, Train Waiter (uncredited)
- Joe Palooka in the Knockout (1947) – Smoky
- Unconquered (1947) – Jason
- The Peanut Man (1947) as Dr. George Washington Carver
- King of the Gamblers (1948) as Tom the Porter (uncredited)
- Silver River (1948) as Servant (uncredited)
- An Act of Murder (1948) as Mr. Pope
- The Great Dan Patch (1949) as Voodoo
- Riding High (1950) as Whitey
- County Fair (1950) as Romulus (uncredited)
- Apache Drums (1951) as Jehu
- My Forbidden Past (1951) as Pompey
- She Couldn't Say No (1952) as Diaper Delivery Man (uncredited)
- The Las Vegas Story (1952) as Pullman Porter (uncredited)
- Caribbean Gold (1952) as Quashy
- The Sun Shines Bright (1953) as Uncle Zack
- Jamaica Run (1953) as Mose
- Porgy and Bess (1959) as Peter
- Buck and the Preacher (1972) as Cudjo
- The World's Greatest Athlete (1973) as Gazenga's Assistant
- Car Wash (1976) as Snapper
- Passing Through (1977) as Poppa Harris
- The Black Stallion (1979) as Snoe

== Sources ==
- Sampson, Henry T. Ghost Walks: A Chronological History of Blacks in Show Business, 1865–1910, Scarecrow Press, Inc., 1988 – ISBN 0810820706
- Wintz, Cary D. Encyclopedia of the Harlem Renaissance, Routledge, 2004. ISBN 157958389X
- Penn, Arthur S. Before the Harlem Renaissance. Collodion Press: New York. 2010.
