= Mabel Scott =

American gospel music and R&B vocalist (1915–2000)

Mabel Bernice Scott (April 30, 1915 – July 20, 2000) was an American gospel music and R&B vocalist. She lived in New York and Cleveland before arriving on the West Coast blues scene in 1942. Mabel is probably remembered more for her 1948 hits "Elevator Boogie" and "Boogie Woogie Santa Claus" than for her 1949–1951 marriage to the featured piano player of "Elevator Boogie", Charles Brown of Johnny Moore's Three Blazers.

== Early life ==
Mabel Scott was born in Richmond, Virginia, the daughter of Rachael and Thomas Scott. By 1930, she was living in New York City with her mother. She developed her singing voice in church, eventually forming an all-girl gospel group, the Song Cycles. Around 1932 Scott began singing at Harlem's Cotton Club with Cab Calloway's Orchestra and the dancing Nicholas Brothers.

== Europe ==
Scott moved to Cleveland, Ohio in 1936, then she and pianist Bob Mosley went to England and recorded on the Parlophone Records label. World War II forced her to stop her European tours, and she settled in Los Angeles, where she became part of the postwar West Coast jazz and R&B scene.

== Los Angeles ==
Following a short spell with Jimmie Lunceford's Orchestra, Scott was a regular performer by 1943 at Club Alabam, along with master of ceremonies Wynonie Harris. She sang with a group led by Lorenzo Flennoy and began recording for the Hub and Excelsior labels. In 1948 she toured and scored Billboard R&B hits with "Boogie Woogie Santa Claus" and "Elevator Boogie." Scott married her pianist, Charles Brown, in 1949, and was divorced from him about three years later.

In the early 1950s Scott recorded for King Records, Coral Records, Brunswick Records, and Parrot Records. Her final recordings were on Festival Records as part of an Australian tour backed by Les Welch's band.

== Later life ==
Disillusioned with the music business and unhappy after her second marriage, Mabel Scott returned to her gospel roots, singing only in church for the rest of her life. She was given a Pioneer Award by the Rhythm and Blues Foundation in 1995. She died in Los Angeles in 2000, aged 85.
