= I'm Lost =

"I'm Lost" is a song written by Otis René and recorded in 1944 by Benny Carter and His Orchestra. The single, with vocals by Dick Gray, went to number one on the Harlem Hit Parade and was his most successful of three entries on the Harlem Hit Parade list. Unlike his previous releases, "I'm Lost" did not cross over to the mainstream pop charts.

== Other recordings ==
Other recordings are:

- The song was also a hit for the King Cole Trio.
- Carmen McRae - Bittersweet (1964)

== See also ==
- List of Billboard number-one R&B singles of the 1940s
