= Leon René =

American songwriter, record label owner, record producer

Leon René (February 6, 1902 – May 30, 1982) was an American music composer of pop, R&B and rock and roll songs and a record producer in the 1930s, 1940s, and 1950s. He sometimes used the songwriting pseudonym Jimmy Thomas or Jimmie Thomas. He also established several record labels.

== History ==
Born in Covington, Louisiana, he is best known for his hit song "When the Swallows Come Back to Capistrano". The song, written as a tribute to the annual springtime return of the cliff swallows to Mission San Juan Capistrano in Southern California, spent several weeks at the top of Your Hit Parade charts during its initial release in 1940. The lyrics say:

When the swallows come back to Capistrano
That's the day you promised to come back to me
When you whispered, "Farewell," in Capistrano
'twas the day the swallows flew out to sea

— excerpt from "When the Swallows Come Back to Capistrano" by Leon René

The song has been recorded by such musicians as The Ink Spots, Fred Waring, Guy Lombardo, and Glenn Miller. A glassed-off room in the mission has been designated in René's honor and displays the upright piano on which he composed the tune, the reception desk from his office and several copies of the song's sheet music and other pieces of furniture, all donated by René's family.

René's other works included "When It's Sleepy Time Down South" (with Clarence Muse and brother Otis René), "Gloria", and such Pop staples as "I Sold My Heart to the Junkman", "Rockin' Robin", and "Boogie Woogie Santa Claus".

== Labels ==
During the 1940s, with his brother and songwriting partner, Otis René, Leon René established and ran the independent rhythm and blues labels Exclusive Records and Excelsior Records. Otis was responsible for any publicly identified with Excelsior Records, while Leon was identified with Exclusive Records. They had purchased their own record plant, but when the format changed from 78 rpm to 45rpm, they could not press the new speed, and the labels went out of business. Otis René's Excelsior label existed from 1944 to 1951. Leon René's Exclusive Records existed from 1944 to 1950. Artists on Exclusive Records included "Frantic" Fay Thomas, the Buddy Baker Sextet, Joe Liggins and Johnny Moore's Three Blazers.

Leon René then set up Class Records in 1951, with his son, Rafael "Googie" René and Preston Love. René then issued successful recordings by his son, plus Oscar McLollie and Bobby Day. Day also recorded as Bobby Byrd of The Hollywood Flames and Bob & Earl. In 1958, he set up Rendezvous Records, which produced hits by Ernie Fields, and B. Bumble and the Stingers, until it folded in 1963.

René died in Los Angeles, California, at the age of 80. He was the grandfather of former X Factor contestant Chris Rene.

== "Boogie Woogie Santa Claus" ==
"Boogie Woogie Santa Claus" is a song written by René. The song was recorded with Mabel Scott in late 1947 for Supreme Records and placed within the top 15 of Billboard's Race Records chart. Patti Page covered the song in 1950 to little attention, but its B-side, "Tennessee Waltz", became a #1 hit in the United States and is one of her best-known works. Lionel Hampton and His Orchestra also released a version in 1950 with Sonny Parker on vocals. It has since been recorded by many other artists, including The Brian Setzer Orchestra for their 2002 album Boogie Woogie Christmas and Colin James for 2007's Colin James & The Little Big Band: Christmas.

== Compositions (selective) ==
- "When the Swallows Come Back to Capistrano"
- "When It's Sleepy Time Down South" (with Clarence Muse and brother Otis René)
- "Gloria"
- "I Sold My Heart to the Junkman"
- "Rockin' Robin"
- "Boogie Woogie Santa Claus"
- "I Lost My Sugar In Salt Lake City"
- "Sweet Lucy Brown"
- "That's My Home"
- "Beyond The Stars"
- "Someone's Rocking My Dreamboat"
- "Near To You" (recorded by the Basin Street Boys)
- "Summertime Gal"
- "If Money Grew On Trees"
