= Googie René =

American musician, bandleader, and songwriter (1927–2007)

- Born: Rafael Leon René; March 30, 1927; Los Angeles, California, U.S.
- Died: November 25, 2007 (aged 80) Los Angeles, California, U.S.
- Genres: R&B, rock and roll, jazz
- Occupations: Pianist, bandleader, songwriter
- Instruments: Piano, organ
- Years active: c.1950–1970s

Rafael Leon René (March 30, 1927 – November 25, 2007), known as Googie René, was an American musician, bandleader, and songwriter.

== Biography ==
He was born in Los Angeles, California, the son of songwriter and record producer Leon René, and acquired the nickname "Googie" as a child. He graduated from Dorsey High School in Baldwin Hills, Los Angeles, studied piano, and began writing songs and working in his father's recording studio. After serving in the US military in Europe, he returned to help set up Class Records with his father and his business partner Preston Love.

Googie René oversaw the label, which had its greatest success later in the 1950s with Bobby Day's hit "Rockin' Robin". René began recording himself in 1956, with the instrumental "Wham Bam", credited to the Googie René Combo. Later records by the Combo featured – as well as René on piano and organ – many of the leading session musicians in Los Angeles, including guitarists Johnny Watson, René Hall, Howard Roberts, and Jimmy Nolen; bassist Red Callender; saxophonists Plas Johnson and Clifford Scott; and drummer Earl Palmer. Their recordings covered jump blues, rock and roll, and jazz. Some of the Googie René Combo's recordings in the early 1960s have been described as "the start of hipster lounge music—a form of jazz-infused pop with an easy-listening sheen".

The Googie René Combo released singles on the Class and Rendezvous labels from the mid-1950s to the mid-1960s. They had three minor hits: "The Slide, Part 1" (No. 20 R&B, early 1961), "Flapjacks, Part 1" (No. 25 R&B, 1963) and "Smokey Joe's La La" (No. 77 pop, No. 35 R&B, 1966). "Smokey Joe's La La" featured on the soundtrack of the 2017 film Baby Driver. The Combo also released three LPs: Beautiful Weekend (1957); Romesville (1959), inspired by Italian movies of the period; and Flapjacks (1963). Several CD compilations of the Combo's recordings have been released, including Wham Bam: The Best of Googie René (2003) and From Romesville to Manhattan (2010).

Googie René died in 2007, aged 80. His son is singer and songwriter Chris Rene.
