= Merry Christmas Baby =

Christmas song written by Lou Baxter and Johnny Moore

Single by Johnny Moore's Three Blazers
- A-side: "Lost in the Night"
- Released: November 1947
- Genre: Rhythm and blues
- Length: 2:42
- Label: Exclusive
- Songwriters: Lou Baxter, Johnny Moore

Official audio
- "Merry Christmas Baby" on YouTube

"Merry Christmas Baby" is an R&B Christmas standard credited to Lou Baxter and Johnny Moore. In 1947, Johnny Moore's Three Blazers recorded the tune, featuring vocals and piano by Charles Brown. Subsequently, many performers have recorded renditions of the song, including Chuck Berry, James Brown, Ike & Tina Turner, Otis Redding, B.B. King, Elvis Presley, Bruce Springsteen, Hanson, Christina Aguilera, and Melissa Etheridge.

== Background ==
Charles Brown tells the story of the song this way:

Leon René had Exclusive Records. They needed a song; Bing Crosby had "White Christmas". Lou Baxter, who was a songwriter and used to hang around Johnny Moore and the Blazers, said "Charles, I want you to do one of my songs because I need money." He had to have an operation on his throat, he had throat cancer. If we did one of his numbers they would give him a $500 advance. So I looked in the satchel, I took the satchel (of songs) home that night and I looked in there, I looked at all them things, and it didn’t impress me. I saw "Merry Christmas Blues", but the idea struck me. I said this would be a good idea, but it wasn't like what he had written. I wrote the title "Merry Christmas Baby", and I wrote the words, how I was going to sing it, and I mapped it out, played the piano, and I presented it to Johnny Moore. We didn't know it was going to be a great big hit, but I thought it was unique. Leon Rene said put the celeste on it. I had never played one. He said it's just like the piano, put it on the side of the piano. 'Cause they didn't have all these synthesizers. He said just play it (on the intro) like you play the piano then get back to the piano. Exclusive never paid copyrights. Hollywood Records took over, lawyers for creditors said artists would get their money, but it never happened. Don Pierce [Hollywood Records] never paid a nickel. Charles lost his letter. When Exclusive Records was sold, the artists/creditors got nothing. Leon Rene promised the artists the money would come. Never happened.

And Johnny Moore did the deal with Lou Baxter and put his own name on it as well, apparently.

Johnny Moore's Three Blazers was one of the hottest blues attractions on the West Coast when their recording of "Merry Christmas Baby" reached number three on Billboard's R&B Juke Box chart during the Christmas season of 1947. Moore, a guitarist, was accompanied by Brown, bassist Eddie Williams and guitarist Oscar Moore (Johnny's brother, then a member of the King Cole Trio).

Brown went on to record many versions of the song throughout his career for various labels, including a popular version in 1956, originally released by Aladdin Records.

== Renditions ==
Rock & roll musician Chuck Berry recorded a version of "Merry Christmas Baby". In 1958, Chess Records released it as a single from the album St. Louis to Liverpool, which reached number 71 on the Billboard Hot 100.

R&B duo Ike and Tina Turner recorded a rendition that was released as a single on Warner Bros Records in 1964.
