= Otis René =

American songwriter

Otis Joseph René Jr. was an American songwriter and record label owner. As a songwriter, he is notable as the co-author of "When It's Sleepy Time Down South", which became a signature song for Louis Armstrong.

== Biography ==
Otis René was born in New Orleans. Prior to devoting his full-time efforts to music, Otis René was a pharmacist in New Orleans. He moved to Los Angeles and married in 1930.

He is best known as the co-author of the 1931 song "When It's Sleepy Time Down South", co-written with his brother Leon René, and Clarence Muse. Other songs co-written by Otis René include "Someone's Rocking My Dreamboat", included by Murray Head on his 1975 album Say It Ain't So and "That's My Home", included by Tony Bennett on his 2002 album, A Wonderful World.

During the 1940s, with his brother, Leon René, Otis René established and ran the independent rhythm and blues labels Exclusive Records and Excelsior Records. Otis was responsible for and publicly identified with Excelsior Records, while his brother Leon was identified with Exclusive Records. Otis René was noted to have earned $25,000 on one song in 1945, "I'm Lost", recorded by the King Cole Trio. René had written and produced the song, as well distributed the record.

In 1945, René was elected president of the newly established Pacific Coast Record Manufacturers' Association.

In support of their record labels, Otis René and Leon René purchased their own record plant, but when the format changed from 78 rpm to 45rpm, they could not press the new speed. Otis René's Excelsior label existed from 1944 to 1951. His brother Leon's Exclusive Records existed from 1944 to 1950. Artists on Otis René's label included Herb Jeffries, Timmie Rogers and the Al Russell Trio.

In 1952, with saxophonist Preston Love, René launched the short-lived Spin Records. The label released material by the Preston Love Orchestra, among others.

He died in Los Angeles, California, in 1970, aged 71.
