= Johnny Moore's Three Blazers =

American vocal group

- Origin: Los Angeles, U.S.
- Genres: West Coast blues, R&B
- Years active: 1940s–1950s
- Past members: Johnny Moore; Eddie Williams; Charles Brown

Johnny Moore's Three Blazers was a popular American vocal group in the 1940s and 1950s. The original members were:

- Johnny Moore (John Dudley Moore, October 20, 1906, Austin, Texas – January 6, 1969, Los Angeles, California);
- Charles Brown (Tony Russell Brown, September 13, 1922, Texas City, Texas – January 21, 1999, Oakland, California);
- Eddie Williams (Edward Earl Williams, June 12, 1912, San Augustine, Texas – February 18, 1995, Los Angeles).

== Career ==
Johnny Moore and his younger brother Oscar grew up in Texas and then Phoenix, Arizona, where they both started playing guitar and formed a string band. In the mid-1930s they relocated to Los Angeles, where Oscar Moore, who had been influenced by Charlie Christian and turned to jazz, joined the King Cole Trio.

Johnny Moore remained devoted to rhythm and blues. His guitar style is considered to have been an influence on Chuck Berry. He joined and formed several groups, before forming the Three Blazers with two other Texans, the bassist Eddie Williams and the pianist and singer Charles Brown, who was newly arrived in the city. After the King Cole Trio moved from Atlas Records to Capitol in 1943, Oscar Moore suggested to Atlas boss Robert Scherman that he replace them with his brother's group. Scherman agreed and in 1945 they had their first hit, backing Ivory Joe Hunter on "Blues at Sunrise".

In 1946, they had their greatest success with "Driftin' Blues", sung by Brown. Moore refused to sign an exclusive contract with any record company, so the group's early records appeared on various labels, particularly Philo (which later became Aladdin Records), Exclusive Records, and Modern Records. The group followed up the success of "Driftin' Blues" with several other big R&B hits, including "Sunny Road" (1946), "New Orleans Blues" (1947), and "Merry Christmas Baby" (1947, also a hit in 1948 and 1949).

In 1947, the Three Blazers performed at the third Cavalcade of Jazz concert held at Wrigley Field in Los Angeles which was produced by Leon Hefflin, Sr. on September 7, 1947. The Valdez Orchestra, The Blenders, T-Bone Walker, Slim Gaillard, The Honeydrippers, Johnny Otis and his Orchestra, Woody Herman, and Sarah Vaughan also performed that same day.

In 1948, frustrated by his lack of recognition and financial reward, Brown left the group for a successful solo career. The remaining two Blazers continued with a succession of vocalists, notably Lee Barnes, Billy Valentine, Floyd Dixon, Mari Jones, Nelson Alexander and, in the mid-1950s, Frankie Ervin. After Nat King Cole broke up his original King Cole Trio, Oscar Moore played as a guest with brother Johnny's group. Johnny Moore and the Blazers continued to record for small labels until the early 1960s.

== Discography ==
=== Singles ===
Atlas releases

- 107 "Melancholy Madeline" (vocal by Frankie Laine) / "Fugue in C Major" (instrumental), 1945
- 110 "Tell Me You'll Wait for Me" (vocal by Charles Brown) / "Escapade" (instrumental), 1945
- 124 "Maureen" (vocal by Frankie Laine) / "Knightfall: Dedicated to Guy Knight" (instrumental), 1946

Philo releases

- 111 "Baby Don't You Cry" / "Blazer's Boogie" (instrumental), 1945
- 112 "Drifting Blues" / "Groovy", 1945

Aladdin releases

- 129 "You Are My First Love" / "Race Track Blues", 1946
- 130 "Till the Real Thing Comes Along" / "Rocks in My Bed", 1946
- 183 "Drifting Blues" (reissue) / "Till the Real Thing Comes Along" (reissue), 1947
- 184 "Baby Don't You Cry" (reissue) / "You Are My First Love" (reissue), 1947

Modern Music releases

- 131 "Travelin' Blues" (also known as "Drifting Blues, Part 2") / "It's the Talk of the Town", 1946
- 133 "What Do You Know About Love" / "Society Boogie" (B-side by Hadda Brooks), 1946
- 134 "Warsaw Concerto (Part 1)" (instrumental) / "Warsaw Concerto (Part 2)" (instrumental), 1946
- 135 "I'll Get Along Somehow" / "Morocco Blues" (B-side by Hadda Brooks), 1946
- 139 "How Deep Is the Ocean" / "You Showed Me the Way", 1946
- 142 "You Won't Let Me Go" / "Shuffle Boogie" (B-side by Will Rowland & His Orchestra), 1946
- 143 "You Left Me Forsaken" / "So Long", 1946
- 151 "Sail On Blues" / "Blue Because of You", 1947
- 152 "Make Believe Land" / "Nursery Rhyme Boogie" (B-side by Happy Johnson & His Jive Five), 1947
- 154 "If You Ever Should Leave" / "It Had to Be You", 1948

Exclusive releases

- 204 "Axis Doom Blues" (vocal by Johnnie McNeil) / "You Taught Me to Love", 1946
- 205 "You Taught Me to Love" / "Johnny's Boogie" (instrumental), 1946
- 205 "End o' War Blues" (vocal by Johnnie McNeil) / "Johnny's Boogie" (re-release), 1946
- 209 "Blues at Sunrise" (with Ivory Joe Hunter) / "You Taught Me to Love" (with Ivory Joe Hunter), 1946
- 214 "C.O.D." / "There Is No Greater Love", 1946
- 221 "It Ain't Gonna Be Like That" / "With My Heart in My Hand", 1946
- 224 "My Silent Love" / "Googie's Boogie" (instrumental), 1946
- 226 "I Want You, I Need You" / "Hard Tack" (instrumental), 1946
- 233 "Be Fair with Me" / "Sunny Road", 1946
- 234 "Bobby Sox Blues" / "(Was I to Blame For) Falling in Love with You", 1946
- 240 "New Orleans Blues" /" I Surrender Dear", 1947
- 243 "Better Watch What You Do" / "I Love to Make Love to You", 1947
- 246 "I Cried for You" / "Pasadena", 1947
- 249 "Moonrise" / "Juke Box Lil ", 1947
- 251 "Changeable Woman Blues" / "Why Is Love Like That", 1947
- 254 "Merry Christmas Baby" / "Lost in the Night", 1947
- 257 "Money's Getting Cheaper" / "It's Over", 1948
- 259 "Soothe Me" / "Scratch Sheet" (instrumental), 1948
- 261 "Teresa" / "Cold in Here", 1948
- 265 "Groovy Movie Blues" /" Free Lancin' Again", 1948
- 268 "I'm So Happy I Could Cry" / "Don't Get Salty, Sugar", 1948
- 272 "You Better Change Your Way of Lovin'" / "Friendless Blues", 1948

Modern releases

- 20-599 "More Than You Know" / "Variety Bounce" (B-side by Hadda Brooks), 1948
- 20-646 "Drifting Blues, Part 2" (reissue) / "Going Home Blues" (B-side by Hootie McShann Trio), 1949
- 20-689 "When Your Lover Has Gone" / "I'll Never Know Why" (B-side by Hadda Brooks), 1949
- 20-731 "I'll Get Along Somehow" (reissue) / "What Do You Know About Love" (reissue), 1950
- 20-768 "Nutmeg" (instrumental) / "What Do You Know About Love" (reissue), 1950

Exclusive releases

- 40X "Jilted Blues" / "Any Old Place with Me", 1948
- 47X "I'm Looking for Love" / "Huggin' Bug", 1948
- 53X "Walkin' in Circles" / "Lonesome Blues", 1948
- 56X "Blues at Sunrise" (with Ivory Joe Hunter) (reissue) / "You Taught Me to Love" (with Ivory Joe Hunter) (reissue), 1948
- 63X "Merry Christmas Baby" (reissue) / "Lost in the Night" (reissue), 1948
- 69X "Where Can I Find My Baby" / "Snuff Dippin' Mama", 1949
- 86X "Love Me Tonight" / "Peek-a-Boo", 1949
- 101X "Tomorrow" / "Tonight I'm Alone", 1949
- 107X "Groovy Movie Blues" (reissue) / "New Orleans Blues" (reissue), 1949
- 111X "B.&O. Blues" / "I Hate Myself", 1949
- 120X "I'll Miss You" / "So There", 1949
- 143X "If You Don't, Why Don't Ya" / "If I Had You", 1949
- 150X "Twenty-Four Hours a Day" / "I Certainly Would", 1949

RCA Victor releases

- How Blue Can You Get, 1949
- 22-0020 "Blues for What I've Never Had" / "How Could I Know", 1949
- 22-0025/50-0009 "A New Shade of Blues" / "This Is One Time, Baby (You Ain't Gonna Two-Time Me), 1949
- 22-0034/50-0018 "Bop-a-Bye Baby" / "What Does It Matter", 1949
- 22-0042/50-0026 "Walkin' Blues" / "You Can Go Feed Yourself", 1949
- 22-0047/50-0031 "Cut Off the Fat (Take Out the Bone)" / "Shuffle Shuck", 1949
- 22-0059/50-0043 "So Long" / "Driftin' Blues", 1949
- 22-0073/50-0073 "Misery Blues" / "Rock with It", 1950
- 22-0086/50-0086 "Rain-Chick" / "Melody", 1950
- 22-0095/50-0095 "Someday You'll Need Me" / "The Jumping Jack", 1950

Swing Time releases

- 238 "Merry Christmas Baby" (reissue) / "Lost in the Night" (reissue), 1950
- 253 "I'll Miss You" (reissue) / "New Orleans Blues" (reissue), 1951
- 259 "Sunny Road" (reissue) / "Be Fair with Me" (reissue), 1951
- 276 "Changeable Woman Blues" (reissue) / "Moonrise" (reissue), 1952

Miscellaneous releases

- "Start It Slow" / unknown side-B, 1959 (Unreleased, snippet used in the TV show Fallout)

=== Albums ===
10-inch (78-rpm) two-disc album set

- 1947 Johnny Moore's 3 Blazers, recorded 1945 (Aladdin A-2), including the following 78-rpm discs:
  - 183 "Drifting Blues" (side 1) / "Till the Real Thing Comes Along" (side 2)
  - 184 "You Are My First Love" (side 3) / "Baby Don't You Cry" (side 4)

10-inch (78-rpm) three-disc album set

- 1947 Johnny Moore's Three Blazers, recorded 1945–1946 (Exclusive EX-1002), including the following 78-rpm discs:
  - 703 "St. Louis Blues" (side 1) / "Gloria" (side 6)
  - 704 "I Wouldn't Mind" (side 2) / "Way over There by the Cherry Tree" (side 5)
  - 705 "Be Sharp, You'll See" (instrumental) (side 3) / "Now That You're Gone Away" (side 4)

LP and CD releases and selected compilations

- 1978 Sunny Road, Charles Brown & Johnny Moore's Three Blazers, recorded 1945–1960 (Route 66 KIX-5)
- 1980 Race Track Blues, Charles Brown & Johnny Moore's Three Blazers, recorded 1945–1956 (Route 66 KIX-17)
- 1986 Why Johnny Why, Johnny Moore's Blazers, recorded 1949–1956 (Route 66 KIX-33)
- 1986 Let's Have a Ball, Charles Brown (with Johnny Moore's Three Blazers), recorded 1945–1961 (Route 66 KIX-34)
- 1989 This Is One Time, Baby, Johnny Moore's Three Blazers, recorded 1945–1949 (Jukebox Lil JB-1105)
- 1989 Sail On Blues, Charles Brown & Johnny Moore's Three Blazers, recorded 1945–1947 (Jukebox Lil JB-1106)
- 1995 Snuff Dippin' Mama, Charles Brown with Johnny Moore's Three Blazers (Night Train International 7017)
- 1995 Walkin' in Circles, Charles Brown with Johnny Moore's Three Blazers (Night Train International 7024)
- 1996 The Chronological Charles Brown: 1944–1945, with Johnny Moore's Three Blazers (Classics #894)
- 1996 Drifting & Dreaming, Charles Brown with Johnny Moore's Three Blazers (Modern Records material) ((Ace CHD-589)
- 1998 Los Angeles Blues: Complete RCA Recordings 1949–1950, Johnny Moore's Three Blazers Featuring Oscar Moore (Westside WESD-217), two-CD set
- 1998 The Chronological Charles Brown: 1946, with Johnny Moore's Three Blazers (Classics 971)
- 2000 The Chronological Charles Brown: 1946–1947, with Johnny Moore's Three Blazers (Classics 1088)
- 2001 The Chronological Charles Brown: 1947–1948, with Johnny Moore's Three Blazers (Classics 1147)
- 2003 Charles Brown: The Classic Earliest Recordings, with Johnny Moore's Three Blazers (JSP 7707), five-CD box set
- 2005 The Best of Charles Brown: West Coast Blues, with Johnny Moore's Three Blazers (Blues Forever 6828)
- 2007 Johnny Moore's Three Blazers: Be Cool: The Modern & Dolphin Sessions 1952–1954 (Ace CHD-1148)
- 2007 Groovy, Charles Brown with Johnny Moore's Three Blazers (Rev-Ola CRBAND-13)
- 2012 The Cool Cool Blues of Charles Brown 1945–1961, with Johnny Moore's Three Blazers (Jasmine 3030), two-CD set
- 2019 The Singles Collection 1945-1952, Johnny Moore's Three Blazers (Acrobat ACTRCD-9079), three-CD set
