= American Memories =

Single by Shamus M'Cool
- B-side: "American Humor"
- Recorded: 1981
- Genre: Country rock
- Length: 3:33
- Label: Perspective
- Songwriter: Shamus M'Cool

"American Memories" is a country rock song recorded by Shamus M'Cool in 1981. It is considered the rarest 45 RPM single to hit the Billboard national pop chart.

== History ==
M'Cool was the alias of Richard Doyle (March 30, 1940 - January 19, 1990), a Los Angeles-based stand-up comedian and talk show host, who previously recorded a novelty song in 1973 called "Santa's Little Helper, Dingo". In 1981, he revived the M'Cool alter ego to record the single "American Memories" under his own label, Perspective Records. Supposedly, Doyle only pressed around 10-20 copies of the record, he sent it to local Los Angeles radio stations with the assurance that the song would get promotion. However, the program directors who promised this had gone on vacation, and the song faded from memory. Despite this, the song's inclusion on playlists in a major radio market led to "American Memories" briefly making the Billboard Hot 100, peaking at #80. The song also made the Cash Box pop chart, peaking at #93.

Due to M'Cool's bad experience with trying to make the song a hit, he rarely recorded music again. A 1988 single, Tuesday Nite In Texas b/w We Got Love, was also pressed on his own Perspective Records.

Because of their limited pressings, all of Doyle's recordings became highly sought after by collectors and have sold for as much as $3000 on eBay.
