= The Red Baron in popular culture =

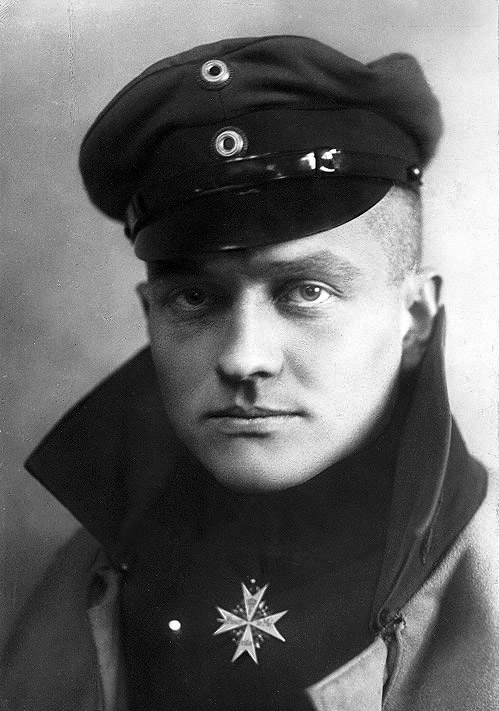
Manfred von Richthofen

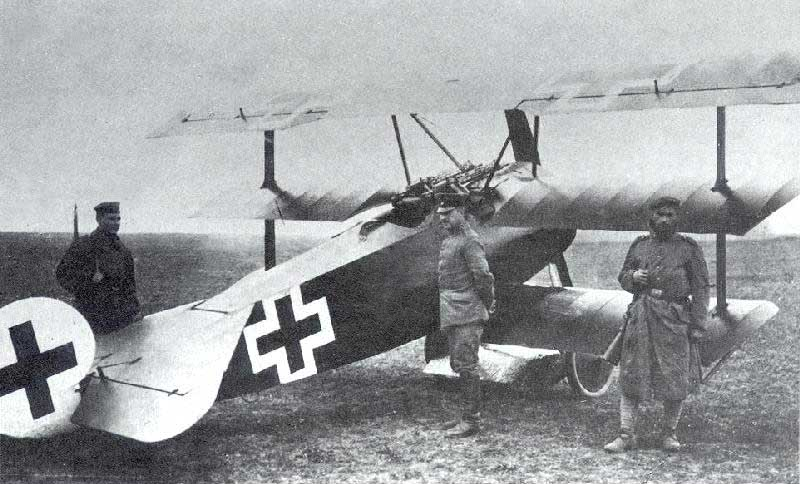
Richthofen's all-red Fokker Dr.I

Manfred von Richthofen, also known as the "Red Baron", was a fighter pilot with the German Air Force during World War I and one of the most famous aviators in history, as well as the subject of many books, films and other media. The following is a list of mentions of him in popular culture.

== Popular fiction ==
- In Youjo Senki, the protagonist Tanya von Degurechaff is based on the Red Baron.
- In Dean McLaughlin's "Hawk Among the Sparrows", the protagonist, a pilot of a modern VTOL interceptor, accidentally appears in 1918, where he withstands a Red Baron analogue named Bruno Keyserling.
- Corto Maltese, a character by Italian cartoonist Hugo Pratt, witnesses the defeat of the Red Baron.
- Hans von Hammer, the protagonist of DC Comics's Enemy Ace was inspired in part by Richthofen. Piloting a scarlet Fokker Dr. 1, von Hammer is a flying knight who fights according to the code of chivalry, despite being deeply disturbed by the slaughter around him. Unlike the Baron, however, von Hammer survived to fight in World War II, in adventures inspired by those of Adolf Galland.
- Manfred von Richthofen is one of the main characters of Jeffrey Shaara's book, To the Last Man.
- The second volume in Kim Newman's Anno Dracula series, The Bloody Red Baron, features a vampire Richthofen who undergoes treatment in order to transform into a large bat-like creature and dispense with the need for an aeroplane.
- Eugene Byrne & Kim Newman's novel Back in the USSA features the Red Baron assisting Mexican forces invading Texas, during a communist revolution in the United States led by Eugene Debs.
- The last book in the Time Machine series, World War I Flying Ace, asks the reader to find out who shot down the Red Baron and take a photograph to prove the answer.
- In the novel Burning Shore by Wilbur Smith, one of the main characters, Lord Andrew Killigan, is shot down by the Red Baron's Flying Circus.
- Baron Soontir Fel, a character from the Star Wars expanded universe (now known as Star Wars Legends) was based on Richthofen, as was Tofen Vane from the Clone Wars comic series Heroes of the Confederacy and Baron Elrik Vonreg, a First Order pilot in the animated TV series Star Wars Resistance. Vonreg's TIE fighter is colored red, similar to Richthofen's aircraft.
- Arrowdreams, a Prix Aurora Award-winning anthology of alternate history short stories, includes "Misfire", a story by Shane Simmons in which Richthofen survives World War I and eventually commands the Luftwaffe in World War II, displacing Hermann Göring, and leading them to an unqualified victory in the Battle of Britain.
- In Fred Saberhagen's Berserker short story "Wings out of Shadow" (1974), a personality construct of Manfred von Richthofen, together with other World War I flying ace constructs, plays a pivotal role in a defensive withdrawal while pursued by a numerically superior force.
- In Biggles Learns to Fly, the protagonist, James "Biggles" Bigglesworth, find himself confronting Richthofen's Flying Circus several times. He engages in direct combat with Richthofen during his first patrol with Royal Flying Corps Squadron 266, and later devises a plan for multiple squadrons to attack the Richthofen Circus stationed at Douai.

== Comic strips (Peanuts) ==
After the first comic strip featuring Snoopy fighting the Red Baron appeared on Sunday October 10, 1965, Richthofen was mentioned regularly in the comic strip Peanuts, by Charles Schulz, and was included in subsequent television specials as a running gag. Snoopy frequently fantasized about being a World War I flying ace. In his daydreams, he imagined his dog house to be a Sopwith Camel and carried a personal grudge against the Red Baron, whom he imagined to be his arch enemy. In spite of Snoopy's best efforts, however, the "Baron" always shot him down with little difficulty, leading Snoopy to curse the Baron for his success and swear to one day shoot him down. This recurring story arc inspired songs by The Royal Guardsmen. The imaginary air battles between Snoopy and the Baron are referenced in The Bloody Red Baron, the second book in Kim Newman's Anno Dracula series, where a beagle resembling Snoopy is shot by the Baron, who feels a strange hatred towards the animal he cannot explain. Despite the antagonistic relationship the characters had in the comic strip, novels and video games, other media depicted them in less combative roles. In the Royal Guardsmen's song "Snoopy's Christmas", the Baron and Snoopy are depicted as participating in the Christmas Truce. A later song by the Guardsmen, "Snoopy for President", sees the Baron cast the ballot that allows Snoopy to become President of the United States, explicitly referring to Snoopy as his friend, as he also does in "Snoopy's Christmas".

== Board game references ==
- The Red Baron was the inspiration for Avalon Hill's 1970s board game Richthofen's War, one of the first World War I aerial combat board games.
- The Red Baron was also prominently featured in Snoopy & The Red Baron, a Milton Bradley skill game released in 1970.

== Movies ==
=== Concrete ===
- 1927: Richthofen, a 1927 German silent war film, starring Carl Walther Meyer as Richthofen, was the first film to portray the life of the World War I fighter pilot.
- 1971: The Roger Corman movie, Von Richthofen and Brown, alternatively titled The Red Baron, starred John Phillip Law as Richthofen.
- 2008: The Red Baron, a romanticized biopic, starring Matthias Schweighöfer as Richthofen.

=== Indirect ===
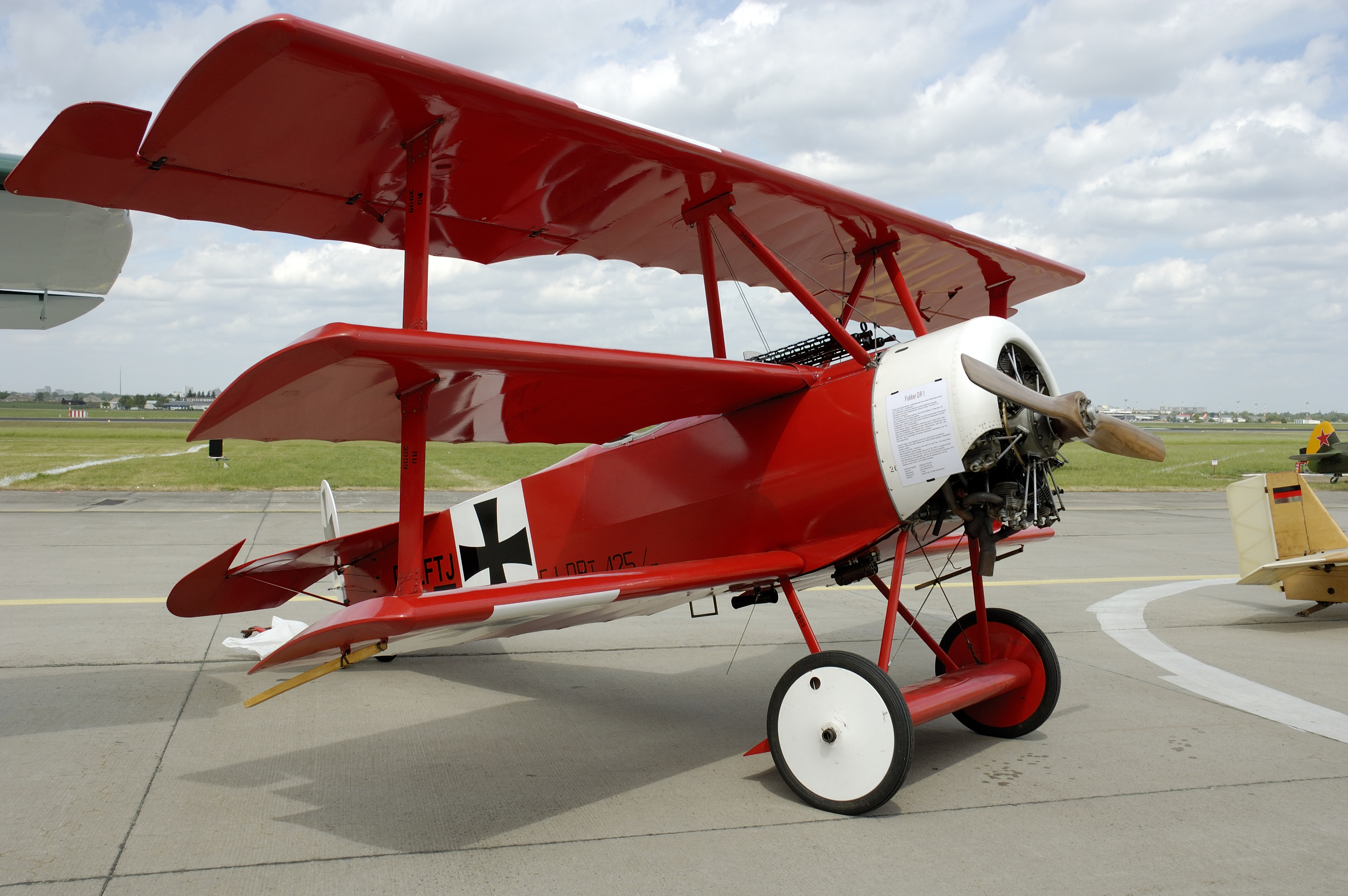
Fokker Dr.I., replica of the famous Manfred von Richthofen triplane at the ILA 2006

- 1927: A Richthofen-based character appears briefly in the World War I-epic Wings, directed by air combat veteran William A. Wellman.
- 1930: The Red Baron was a character in the Howard Hughes film Hell's Angels.
- 1943: He was caricatured in the Disney propaganda film, Victory Through Air Power.
- 1966: Richthofen appears briefly in the film The Blue Max, played by Carl Schell. He offers the film's main character, Bruno Stachel, a position in Jagdgeschwader 1, although Stachel declines.
- 1970: In Darling Lili, set in World War I and starring Julie Andrews and Rock Hudson, the Red Baron is more accurately portrayed as quieter and more reserved than portrayed in The Blue Max (wherein the Baron comes across as rather pompous) and was played by Ingo Mogendorf.
- 1994: Revenge of the Red Baron; Mickey Rooney portrays a former World War I pilot haunted by a doll version of the Red Baron that flies a toy plane. The film also stars Tobey Maguire and Laraine Newman.
- 2005: Curse of the Were-Rabbit; Philip pursues Gromit on a fairgrounds. Gromit comes upon a ride called "Dog Fighters", enters it and flies out in a Sopwith Camel, but Philip follows close behind in Richtofen's Fokker Dr.I, somewhat similar to the setting of the Baron's final fight.
- 2012: War of the Worlds: Goliath; Manfred Von Richthofen leads the steampunk ARES biplanes and triplanes against the invading Martian forces.
- 2015: The Peanuts Movie, created by Blue Sky Studios, features Richthofen's plane as both a toy and when Snoopy is creating his story.

== Music ==
=== Musicals ===
- Des McAnuff wrote The Death of Von Richthofen as Witnessed from Earth, which he directed at the Public Theater in 1982, for which he was awarded a Rockefeller grant.

=== Bands ===
- Barón Rojo and their eponymous song
- Barão Vermelho

=== Albums ===
- Shadow of the Red Baron, the album of Belgian band Iron Mask, released in January 2010.

=== Songs ===
- "Barón Rojo" (Arkangel)
- "Barón Rojo" (Barón Rojo)
- "Wop May" (Stompin' Tom Connors), Richthofen is mentioned in the song
- "Roy Brown and Wop May" (John Spearn)
- "Crimson Rider" (Masterplan)
- "Death or Glory" (Iron Maiden), written from Richthofen's viewpoint
- "Gold Hick" (Guided By Voices), referencing Baron Von Richthofen
- "Not the Red Baron" (Tori Amos)
- "Peanuts" (Stephen Lynch), referencing the rivalry between Snoopy and the Red Baron
- "Red Baron" (Billy Cobham), from Spectrum (1973)
- "Red Baron" (Sabaton (band))
- "Red Baron" (The Bicycling Guitarist), 1995; referencing the character and career of Manfred von Richthofen
- "Red Baron" (Vince Guaraldi)
- "Red Baron/Blue Max" (Iced Earth)
- "Red Baron vs White Death" (Epic Rap Battles of History)
- "Return of the Red Baron" (The Royal Guardsmen)
- "Snoopy for President" (The Royal Guardsmen)
- "Snoopy vs. The Red Baron" (The Royal Guardsmen, 1966)
- "Snoopy's Christmas" (The Royal Guardsmen, referencing the real-life Christmas Truce of 1914)
- "The Red Baron" (The DDTs), instrumental by a Dunedin surf-punk band named after the bass player Aaron Allcock. The Baron currently lives in Melbourne, Australia producing electronic progressive trance and plotting the resurrection of the soul of blues rock.
- "The Red Baron" (Game Theory), from Distortion EP (1984)
- "The Red Baron", from Under the Sign of the Iron Cross (2010) by God Dethroned
- "The Smallest Astronaut" (The Royal Guardsmen)
- "The Baron" (Dick Curless)
- "Butt Baby" (Kris Caprani & Nic Hunter)
- "The Red Baron" (Sabaton)

== Television ==
- The Red Baron Prince Hirik And We’Na Bird (June 18, 1957)
- The Red Baron makes an appearance in the Blackadder Goes Forth episode "Private Plane", portrayed by Adrian Edmondson. After joining the Royal Flying Corps as an excuse to escape the trenches, Captain Blackadder and Private Baldrick are shot down and captured by the Baron. In a parody of wartime British propaganda, the Baron is portrayed as a stuffy martinet with an exaggerated Prussian accent who lacks a sense of humour, but tries to make up for it. He informs Blackadder and Baldrick, "For us, a toilet is a mundane, functional item. For you it is the basis of an entire culture!" Before retiring to his chateau, the Baron comments that "Gallant Lord Flashheart still eludes me." Soon after, Flashheart and Lieutenant George arrive to rescue their fellow flyers. At last facing his greatest adversary, the Baron gives a soliloquy about chivalry and honor. Disgusted, Lord Flashheart shoots the Baron dead.
- Richthofen was featured in an episode of Fantasy Island, titled "The Red Baron", in which a patron of the island wished to save the Baron (portrayed by Ron Ely) from his doom.
- In The Red Baron, an animated episode of The ABC Saturday Superstar Movie, the Baron was portrayed as a talking brown German Shepherd Dog.
- In the animated TV series Wacky Races, the Red Max and his car/airplane hybrid, the Crimson Haybaler, are based on the Red Baron and his plane.
- Char Aznable of Mobile Suit Gundam is based partially on the Red Baron, nicknamed the Red Comet. Both are aces famous for their striking red vehicles.
- A recurring antagonist in Space: Above and Beyond is a chig ace named Chiggy Von Richthofen.
- In the Battlestar Galactica episode "Scar", there is an ace Cylon Raider who is based on the Red Baron.
- The New Scooby-Doo Movies episode "The Ghost of the Red Baron" features a villain masquerading as Richthofen's ghost.
- Richthofen appears in The Adventures of Young Indiana Jones TV film "Young Indiana Jones and the Attack of the Hawkmen", in which he is portrayed by Marc Warren. In the film, Richthofen has several run-ins with a young Indiana Jones (portrayed by Sean Patrick Flanery). During their first encounter, Indy jokingly asks the German pilots why they don't paint their planes red. Jones's remark inspires Richthofen to give his plane a paint job.
- In the animated TV series SWAT Kats: The Radical Squadron, the undead villain the Red Lynx is based on the Red Baron.
- The Red Baron is parodied as the "Black Baron" in a Gumby episode where Gumby is an aviator of the First World War.
- Richthofen has been featured on two different shows on the History Channel, Unsolved History and Man, Moment, Machine.
- In Batman: The Brave and The Bold Batman has a brief team up with Hans Von Hammer, the Enemy Ace, who is partly inspired by Richtofen including the use of a red Dr1 Fokker Triplane.
- In the animated TV series SpongeBob SquarePants, in the episode "Shanghaied", SpongeBob mistook the Flying Dutchman for The Red Baron.
- The pilot episode of the 1982 TV series Voyagers! sees the two main characters dogfighting with Richthofen when they travel back in time. In that episode, Richthofen personally challenges American ace Eddie Rickenbacker; in reality, no such engagement ever occurred.
- Although never seen directly, echoing the encounters in the strips, Richthofen made his first "appearance" with the Peanuts gang in their third animated TV special It's the Great Pumpkin, Charlie Brown in which he battles and defeats Snoopy. Snoopy and the Baron would have later encounters in various other animated specials as well, each time with the Baron defeating Snoopy with relative ease.
- In the 1970s' animated TV series, Laff-A-Lympics, one of the members of the "Really Rottens" team is a German flying ace parody named "The Dread Baron"
- In Ring Raiders, the character Baron von Claudeitz is meant as an homage to Richthofen, and retains his original (modified) aircraft, a Fokker Dr.I.
- In the It's Always Sunny in Philadelphia episode "Charlie Kelly: King of the Rats", Charlie Kelly has a recurring dream about a German man named "Hans Wormhat," who flies a biplane and shoots at Charlie as he runs across a field. The gang misinterpret Charlie's dream journal entry about "worm hat," and present him with birthday gifts that interpret the concept of a worm hat.

== Video game references ==
There have been a number of World War I flight simulators involving Manfred von Richthofen. They include Hunt for the Red Baron, written and published by Small Rockets, Knights of the Sky by Microprose, and Red Baron by Dynamix and published by Sierra Entertainment which was followed up by a less successful sequel Red Baron II.

- The Red Baron is mentioned in Call of Duty 4: Modern Warfare as a codename.
- Empire Earth has a German campaign in which four missions allow the players to control Manfred von Richthofen.
- In League of Legends, one of the champions, Corki, had a purchasable skin designated "Red Baron Corki" that is designed to make his aircraft a red World War I biplane.
- In Left 4 Dead, there is an achievement, "Dead Baron", that can be earned by completing the Dead Air campaign, a campaign set in an airport.
- In the Nintendo DS game Phoenix Wright: Ace Attorney, one of the characters is named Manfred von Karma. Like the Red Baron, he is known for having a perfect career. He also receives his comeuppance from a single bullet.
- Red Baron 3D World War I Combat Flight Simulator.
- Sky Kid, an arcade video game by Namco depicts the fanciful air journey of the "Red Baron" and the "Blue Max".
- Titles for the Atari system in the 1980s, and in 2006 by Namco for PlayStation 2, PSP, and Xbox game systems have also been released.
- The Sony PlayStation 2 game, Sly 3: Honor Among Thieves, features a character named "The Black Baron", a flying ace who has never lost a dogfight.
- In Call of Duty: Black Ops II, if the player earned a kill with a Dragonfire, a flying vehicle, they earn a badge named "Red Baron".
- "Snoopy and the Red Baron" is a video game released in 1983 for the Atari 2600. The game is a single player shooter in which the player guides Snoopy on his dog house in combat against the Red Baron.
- "Snoopy vs. the Red Baron" is a computer game with Snoopy as the protagonist and Manfred von Richthofen as the antagonist. The game is available for PlayStation 2, the PlayStation Portable and the PC. The game was followed by a sequel Snoopy Flying Ace with the same premise for the Xbox 360.
- The PC game Star Trek: Judgment Rites features the character Trelane from the original series TV episode Squire of Gothos imagining himself as World War I pilot complete with the Red Baron's signature Fokker Triplane.
- The arcade version of Trivial Pursuit included a player avatar called "Baron von Rightoften", designed to resemble the Red Baron.
- The Nintendo entertainment system game Indiana Jones: The Chronicles, set during World War 1, contains an airplane combat level with the main enemy "baron von Richtoven", who is allegedly shot down by Indiana Jones and William Bishop.
- In Thrillville: Off the Rails there is an arcade flying ace named Barry von Rictoven who is referred to several times as "The Red Barry" and flies a triplane.
- Wings, a Cinemaware title in which the player is an Allied pilot in France during World War I, follows the vicissitudes of the Red Baron, from his rising to his death.
- In Halo 5: Guardians the gamemode "Warzone" includes a boss named Baron 'Sroam, who is the pilot of a red flying vehicle.
- Richthofen is prominently featured in the World War I-themed first-person shooter Battlefield 1.
- Titanfall 2 features a skin for the Ion Titan called "Red Baron". It is unlocked if a save file for Battlefield 1 is located on the same system.
- Grand Theft Auto: San Andreas features a red remote-controlled bi-plane called "RC Baron".
- Wings 2: Aces High, SNES game, has the player will get to face off with the Red Baron.
- Army Men: Air Attack 2 features a character, Baron von Beige, who is based on Richthofen. "Tan Baron" flies a Fokker Dr.I, like The Red Baron.
- All German fighter planes in the Battlefield 1 campaign Friends in High Places are painted like Richthofen's.
- In World of Warships, the highest-tiered german aircraft carrier is named Manfred von Richthofen.

== Miniatures and crafts ==
- George Barris custom Hot Rod automobile, merchandised into the Hot Wheels toy cars and collectible scale cars; also the Tom Daniels Monogram model car kit.
- A gun truck that served in Vietnam was named and painted the Red Baron.
- Ghost of the Red Baron model kit, by Monogram, shows a 1/6 scale skull with chrome stahelm (helmet) on an Iron Cross stand.
- Divebomb from the Transformers: Revenge of the Fallen toyline transforms into an Albatros D.III in Red Baron-inspired livery.

== Buildings ==
- Red Baron Hangar, Idaho Falls - a log building that served as an airplane hangar, historical building

== Plants and food ==
- Red Barron Onions, Unio Porrum, a leek type strain of red to purple color small non-bulbing, bunching onion for salads.
- Red Baron Onion, Unio Cepa, a bulbed large variety onion.
- Red Baron Peach, a yellow freestone peach variety.
- Red Baron Crabapple, Malus Hybrida, a flowering tree.
- Red Baron Grass, Imperata, an ornamental Japanese blood grass.
- Red Baron Flowering plant, Protea, 5 foot tall semi tropical shrub with multiple flowerheads.
- Red Baron Pizza, pre-made frozen pizza.

== Sports ==
- The Wilkes-Barre/Scranton Red Barons were a professional Minor League Baseball team based in Moosic, Pennsylvania from 1989 to 2006. The team was the Triple A affiliate for Major League Baseball team the Philadelphia Phillies.
- Formula One driving legend Michael Schumacher was nicknamed "the Red Baron", due to his German heritage and his fame as a driver for the red colored Ferrari team.
- Baseball pitcher Rick Sutcliffe was nicknamed "The Red Baron" during his career because of the color of his beard and hair.
- Football and baseball player David Barron was better known as "Red Barron".
- Former St. Louis Blues player, and current University of Michigan head hockey coach Red Berenson was also nicknamed "The Red Baron", both due to his hair color, and his last name.

== Other namesakes ==
A great variety of model airplanes of all scales, and flying balsa planes, portrait dolls and figurines representing the baron and his aircraft have been produced. The Red Baron name has been attached to small plush figures and teddy bears and is widely applied to products unrelated to the WWI ace.

== Rhinebeck Aerodrome ==
The exploits of Richthofen and his peers inspired Cole Palen to create Old Rhinebeck Aerodrome in Rhinebeck, New York. Palen is credited with creating the kit-plane craze in the U.S., and was instrumental in restoring and/or retrieving priceless examples of World War I aviation. Palen built a replica Fokker Dr I, which he flew in hundreds of simulated dogfights at Rhinebeck.
