= Christmas music =

Music associated with Christmas

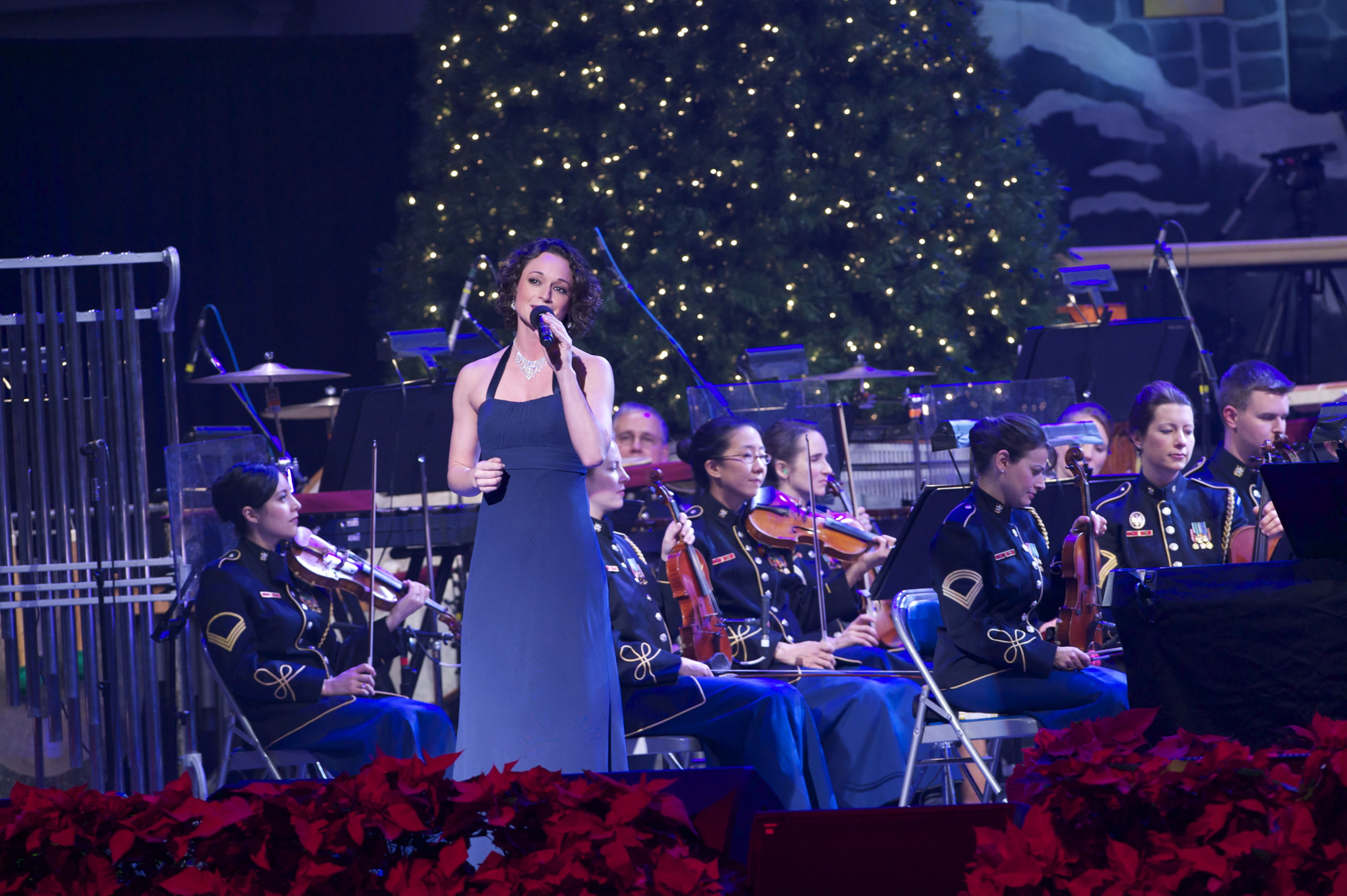
The U.S Army Band performs a Christmas concert in 2010.

Christmas music comprises a variety of genres of music regularly performed or heard around the Christmas season. Music associated with Christmas may be purely instrumental, or in the case of carols, may employ lyrics about the nativity of Jesus Christ, traditions such as gift-giving and merrymaking, cultural figures such as Santa Claus, or other topics. Many songs simply have a winter or seasonal theme, or have been adopted into the canon for other reasons.

Traditional Christmas carols include pieces such as "Silent Night", "O Holy Night", "Down in Yon Forest", "O Come, All Ye Faithful" and "Hark! The Herald Angels Sing". While most Christmas songs before the 20th century were of a traditional religious character and reflected the Nativity story of Christmas, the Great Depression brought a stream of widely popular songs of U.S. origin that did not explicitly mention the Christian nature of the holiday, but rather the more cultural themes and customs associated with it. These included songs aimed at children such as "Santa Claus Is Comin' to Town" and "Rudolph the Red-Nosed Reindeer", as well as sentimental ballad-type songs performed by famous crooners of the era, such as "Have Yourself a Merry Little Christmas", "Blue Christmas" and "White Christmas", the latter of which remained the best-selling single of all time as of 2024. Elvis' Christmas Album (1957) by Elvis Presley is the best-selling Christmas album of all time, having sold more than 20 million copies worldwide.

Performances of Christmas music at public concerts, in churches, at shopping malls, on city streets, and in private gatherings are a staple of the Christmas season in many cultures across the world. Many radio stations convert to a 24/7 Christmas music format leading up to the holiday, though the standard for most stations in the US is on or near Veterans Day, some stations adopt the format as early as the day after Halloween (or, exceptionally rarely, even sooner) as part of a phenomenon known as "Christmas creep". Liturgically, Christmas music traditionally ceases to be performed at the arrival of Candlemas, the traditional end of the Christmas-Epiphanytide season.

== History ==
=== Early music ===
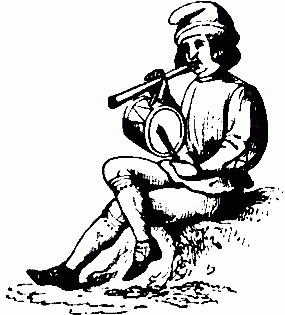
A Christmas minstrel playing pipe and tabor

Music associated with Christmas is thought to have its origins in 4th-century Rome, in Latin-language hymns such as Veni redemptor gentium. By the 13th century, under the influence of Francis of Assisi, the tradition of popular Christmas songs in regional native languages developed. Christmas carols in the English language first appear in a 1426 work of John Awdlay, an English chaplain, who lists twenty five "caroles of Cristemas", probably sung by groups of wassailers who would travel from house to house. In the 16th and 17th century, various Christmas carols still sung to this day, including "God Rest Ye Merry, Gentlemen" (earliest extant version dates to the 1650s) and "Ríu Ríu Chíu" (first published no later than 1556), first emerged.

Music was an early feature of the Christmas season and its celebrations. The earliest examples are hymnographic works (canticles and litanies) intended for liturgical use in observance of both the Feast of the Nativity and Theophany, many of which are still in use by the Eastern Orthodox Church. The 13th century saw the rise of the carol written in the vernacular, under the influence of Francis of Assisi.

In the Middle Ages, the English combined circle dances with singing and called them carols. Later, the word carol came to mean a song in which a religious topic is treated in a style that is familiar or festive. From Italy, it passed to France and Germany, and later to England. Christmas carols in English first appear in a 1426 work of John Audelay, a Shropshire priest and poet, who lists 25 "caroles of Cristemas", probably sung by groups of wassailers, who went from house to house. Music in itself soon became one of the greatest tributes to Christmas, and Christmas music includes some of the noblest compositions of the great musicians. Martin Luther, the father of Lutheran Christianity, encouraged congregational singing during the Mass, in addition to spreading the practice of caroling outside the liturgy.

=== Puritan prohibition ===
During the Commonwealth of England government under Cromwell, the Rump Parliament prohibited the practice of singing Christmas carols as Pagan and sinful. Like other customs associated with Christianity of the Catholic and Magisterial Protestant traditions, it earned the disapproval of Puritans. Famously, Cromwell's interregnum prohibited all celebrations of the Christmas holiday. This attempt to ban the public celebration of Christmas can also be seen in the early history of Father Christmas.

The Puritan Westminster Assembly of Divines established Sunday as the only holy day in the liturgical calendar in 1644. The new liturgy produced for the English church recognized this in 1645, and so legally abolished Christmas. Its celebration was declared an offense by Parliament in 1647. There is some debate as to the effectiveness of this ban, and whether or not it was enforced in the country. During the years that the Puritan ban on Christmas was in place in England, semi-clandestine religious services marking Christ's birth continued to be held, and people sang carols in secret.

Puritans generally disapproved of the celebration of Christmas—a trend that resurfaced in Europe and the US through the eighteenth, nineteenth and twentieth centuries.

=== Royal restoration ===
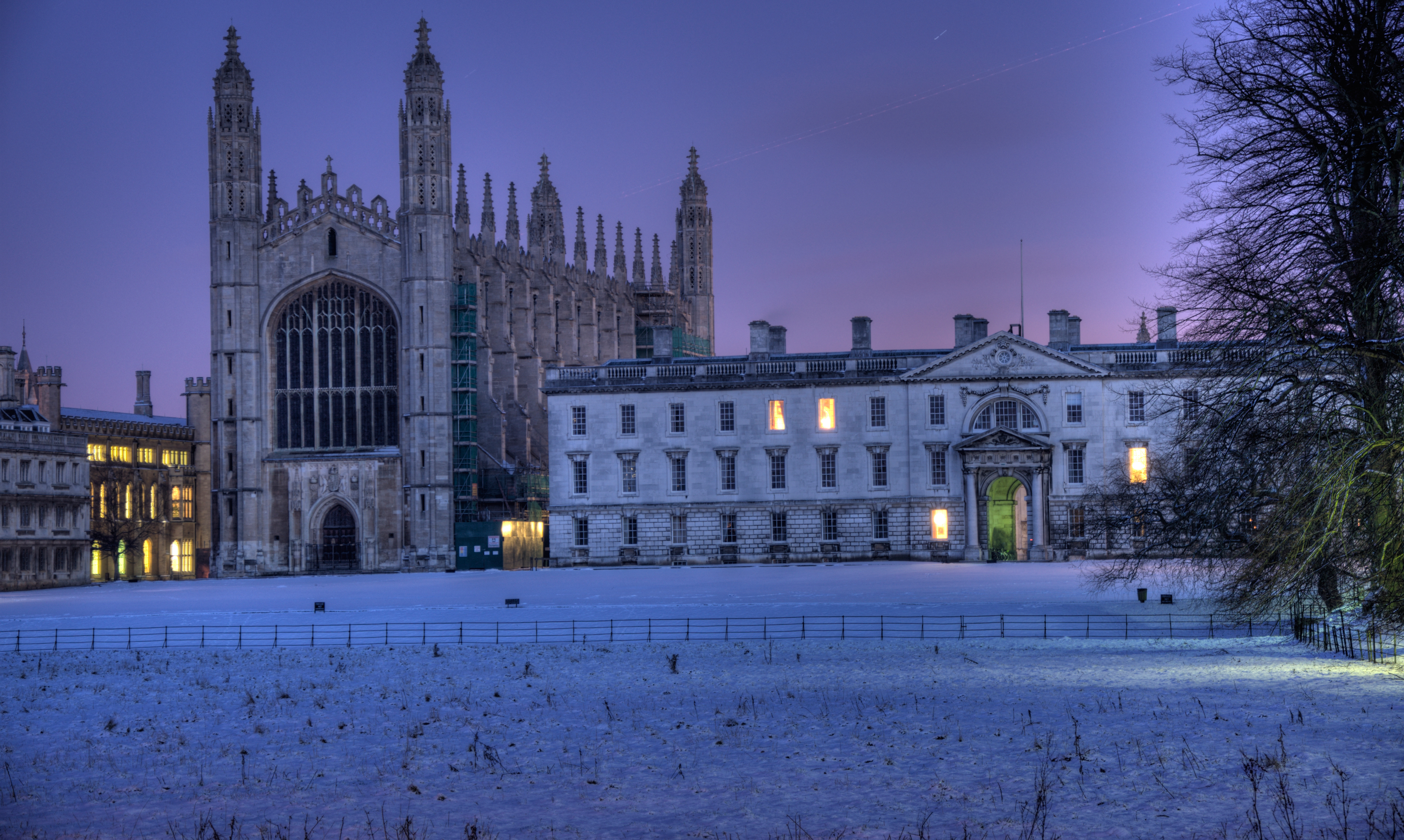
King's College Chapel, Cambridge, (left) in the snow where the Nine Lessons and Carols are broadcast on the BBC and around the world on Christmas Eve

When in May 1660 Charles II restored the Stuarts to the throne, the people of England once again practiced the public singing of Christmas carols as part of the revival of Christmas customs, sanctioned by the king's own celebrations.

The Victorian Era saw a surge of Christmas carols associated with a renewed admiration of the holiday, including "Silent Night", "O Little Town of Bethlehem", and "O Holy Night". The first Christmas songs associated with Saint Nicholas or other gift-bringers also came during 19th century, including "Up on the Housetop" and "Jolly Old St. Nicholas". Many older Christmas hymns were also translated or had lyrics added to them during this period, particularly in 1871 when John Stainer published a widely influential collection entitled "Christmas Carols New & Old". William Sandys's Christmas Carols Ancient and Modern (1833), contained the first appearance in print of many now-classic English carols, and contributed to the mid-Victorian revival of the holiday. Singing carols in church was instituted on Christmas Eve 1880 (Nine Lessons and Carols) in Truro Cathedral, Cornwall, England, which is now seen in churches all over the world.

According to one of the only observational research studies of Christmas caroling, Christmas observance and caroling traditions vary considerably between nations in the 21st century, while the actual sources and meanings of even high-profile songs are commonly misattributed, and the motivations for carol singing can in some settings be as much associated with family tradition and national cultural heritage as with religious beliefs. Christmas festivities, including music, are also celebrated in a more secular fashion by such institutions as the Santa Claus Village, in Rovaniemi, Finland.

=== Alms ===
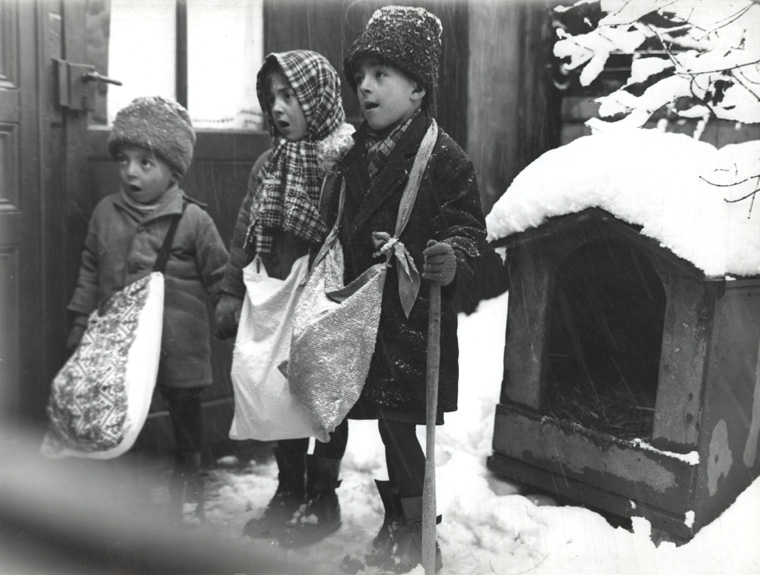
Child Christmas carolers in Bucharest, Romania 1929

The tradition of singing Christmas carols in return for alms or charity began in England in the seventeenth century after the Restoration. Town musicians or 'waits' were licensed to collect money in the streets in the weeks preceding Christmas, the custom spread throughout the population by the eighteenth and nineteenth centuries up to the present day. Also from the seventeenth century, there was the English custom, predominantly involving women, of taking a wassail bowl to their neighbors to solicit gifts, accompanied by carols. Despite this long history, many Christmas carols date only from the nineteenth century onwards, with the exception of songs such as the "Wexford Carol", "God Rest Ye Merry Gentlemen", "As I Sat on a Sunny Bank", "The Holly and the Ivy", the "Coventry Carol" and "I Saw Three Ships". The practice of ordinary Christian church members of various denominations going door to door and singing carols continues in many parts of the world, such as in India; residents give money to the carolers, which churches distribute to the poor.

=== Church feasts ===
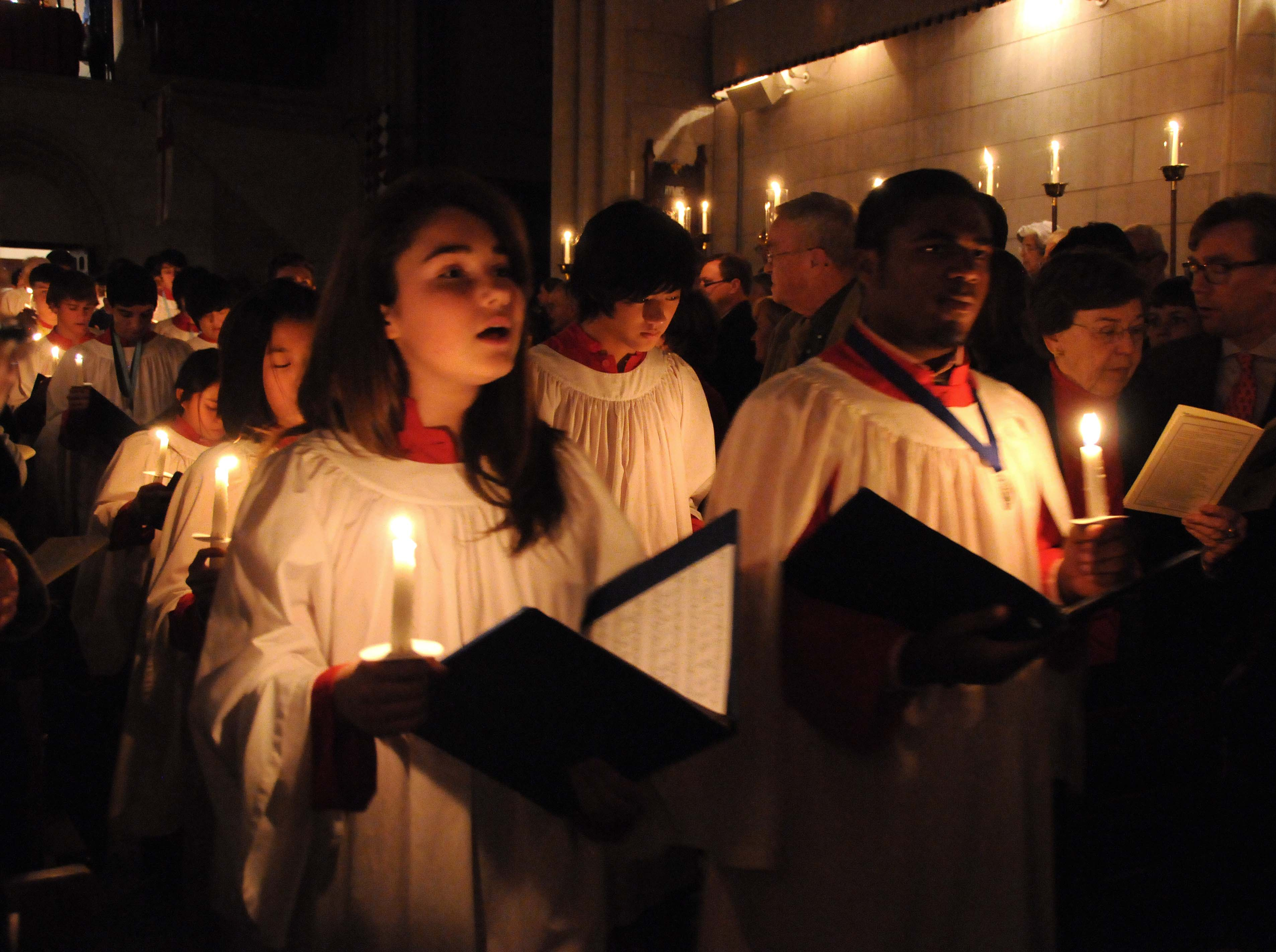
The large repertoire of Advent and Christmas church music plays an important role in services.

The importance of Advent and the feast of Christmastide within the church year means there is a large repertoire of music specially composed for performance in church services celebrating the Christmas story. Various composers from the Baroque era to the 21st century have written Christmas cantatas and motets. Some notable compositions include:

- Thomas Tallis: Mass "Puer natus est nobis" (1554)
- Giovanni Pierluigi da Palestrina: O magnum mysterium (1569)
- Orlande de Lassus: Resonet in laudibus (1569)
- Heinrich Schütz: Weihnachtshistorie (1664)
- Johann Sebastian Bach: several cantatas for Christmas to Epiphany and Christmas Oratorio (1734)
- Jakub Jan Ryba: Czech Christmas Mass "Hey, Master!" (1796)
- Anton Bruckner: Virga Jesse floruit (1885)

== Classical music ==
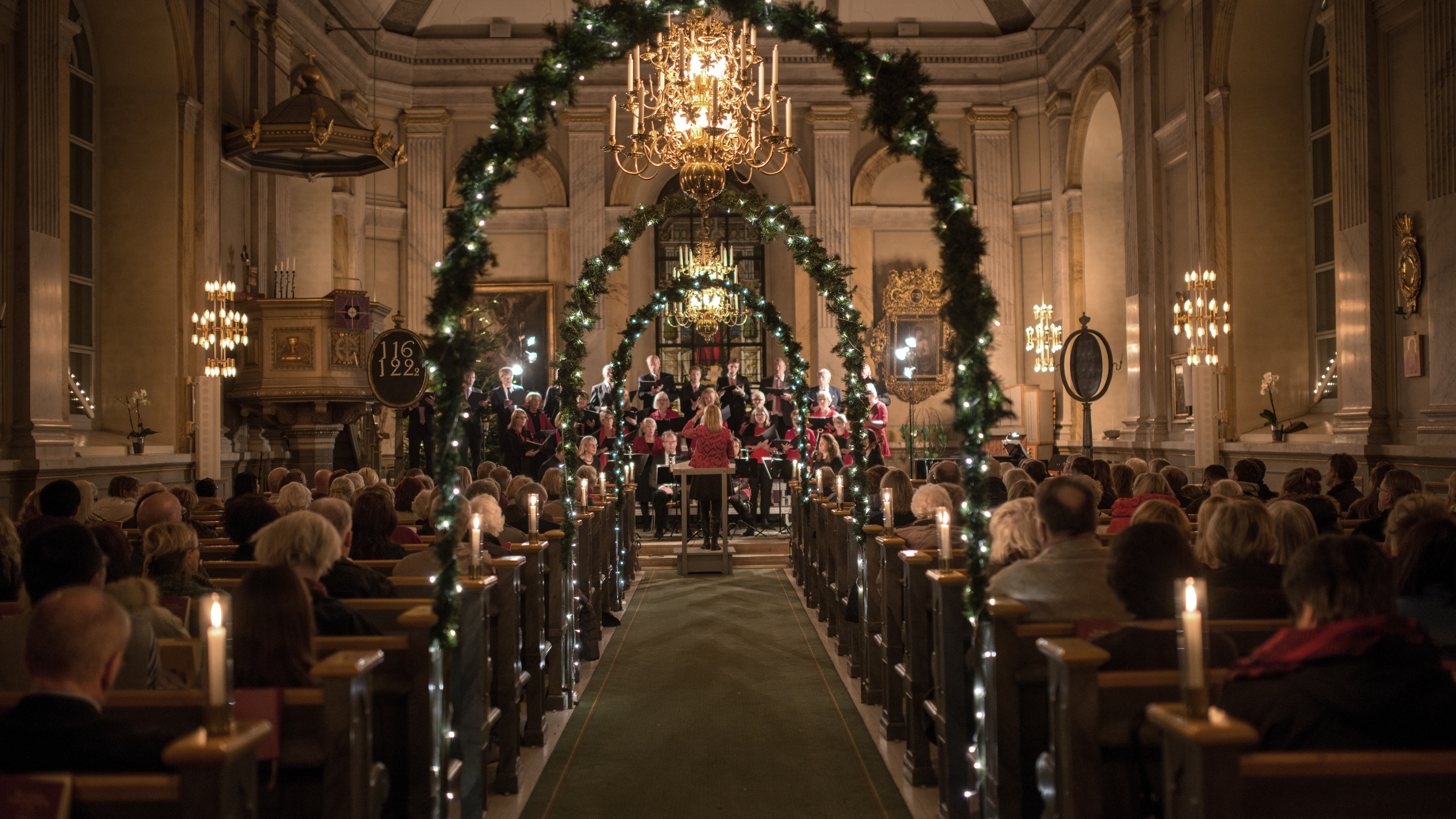
Classical concerts are popular at Christmas, such as this performance in a church in Sweden.

Many large-scale religious compositions are performed in a concert setting at Christmas. Performances of George Frideric Handel's oratorio Messiah are a fixture of Christmas celebrations in some countries, and although it was originally written for performance at Easter, it covers aspects of the Biblical Christmas narrative. Informal Scratch Messiah performances involving public participation are very popular in the Christmas season. Johann Sebastian Bach's Christmas Oratorio (Weihnachts-Oratorium, BWV 248), written for Christmas 1734, describes the birth of Jesus, the annunciation to the shepherds, the adoration of the shepherds, the circumcision and naming of Jesus, the journey of the Magi, and the adoration of the Magi. Antonio Vivaldi composed the Violin Concerto RV270 "Il Riposo per il Santissimo Natale" ("For the Most Holy Christmas"). Arcangelo Corelli composed the Christmas Concerto in 1690. Peter Cornelius composed a cycle of six songs related to Christmas themes he called Weihnachtslieder. Setting his own poems for solo voice and piano, he alluded to older Christmas carols in the accompaniment of two of the songs.

Other classical works associated with Christmas include:

- Marc-Antoine Charpentier, 9 vocal settings and 2 instrumental settings:
  - Messe de Minuit H.9 for soloists, choir, flûtes, strings and bc (1690)
  - In nativitatem Domini canticum H.314 for 4 voices, 2 flutes, 2 violins and bc (1670)
  - Canticum in nativitatem Domini H.393 for 3 voies, 2 treble instruments and bc (1675)
  - Pastorale de Noël H.414 for soloists, choir, 2 treble instruments and bc (1683–85)
  - Oratorio de Noël H.416 for soloists, choir, flutes, strings and bc (1690)
  - Dialogus inter angelos et pastores Judae in nativitatem Domini H.420 for soloists, choir, flutes, strings and bc (1695?)
  - In nativitate Domini Nostri Jesu Christi canticum H.421 for 3 voices and bc (1698–99)
  - Pastorale de Noël H.482 for soloists, choir, 2 treble viols and bc (1683–85)
  - Pastorale de Noël H.483 H.483 a H.483 b for soloists, choir, 2 flutes, 2 treble viols and bc (1683–85)
  - Noël pour les instruments H.531 for flutes, strings and bc (1688?)
  - Noël sur les instruments H.534 for flutes, strings and bc (1698)
- Christus (1847) an unfinished oratorio by Felix Mendelssohn
- L'enfance du Christ (1853–54) by Hector Berlioz
- Oratorio de Noël (1858) by Camille Saint-Saëns
- The Nutcracker (1892) by Pyotr Ilyich Tchaikovsky
- Fantasia on Christmas Carols (1912) and Hodie (1954), both by Ralph Vaughan Williams
- A Ceremony of Carols (1942) by Benjamin Britten.

== Christmas carols ==
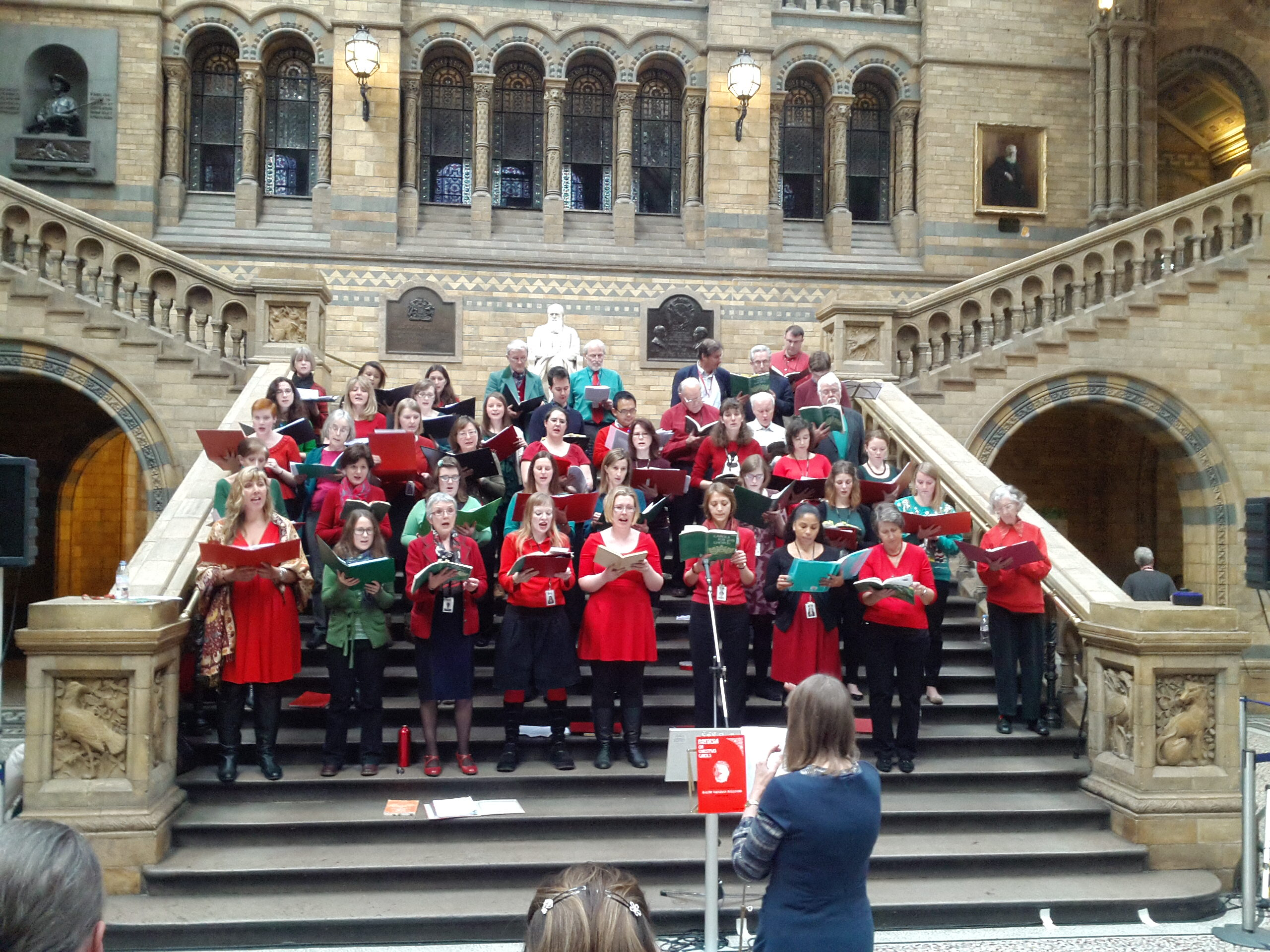
Museum staff singing Christmas carols in the Natural History Museum, London

Songs which are traditional, even some without a specific religious context, are often called Christmas carols. Each of these has a rich history, some dating back many centuries.

=== Standards ===
A popular set of traditional carols that might be heard at any Christmas-related event include:

'A collection of traditional Christmas music'
performed by James D. Blodget on a Roland U-20 synthesizer, December 23, 2004.

"Joy to the World"
Performed a cappella by Kim Butler on December 15, 2006.

"I Saw Three Ships"
Tune of traditional English Christmas carol transcribed by CambridgeBayWeather.

"El Noi de la Mare"
A traditional Catalan Christmas carol, arranged for guitar.

- "Angels We Have Heard on High" (in the UK the text of "Angels from the Realms of Glory" is sung to this tune)
- "Away in a Manger"
- "Deck the Halls"
- "Ding Dong Merrily on High"
- "The First Noel"
- "Go Tell It on the Mountain"
- "God Rest Ye Merry, Gentlemen"
- "Good King Wenceslas"
- "Hark! The Herald Angels Sing"
- "I Saw Three Ships"
- "It Came Upon the Midnight Clear"
- "Joy to the World"
- "O Christmas Tree" (O Tannenbaum)
- "O Come, All Ye Faithful" (Adeste Fideles)
- "O come, O come, Emmanuel"
- "O Holy Night" (Cantique de Noël)
- "O Little Town of Bethlehem"
- "Once in Royal David's City"
- "Silent Night" (Stille Nacht, heilige Nacht)
- "The Twelve Days of Christmas"
- "We Three Kings of Orient Are"
- "We Wish You a Merry Christmas"
- "What Child Is This?"
- "While Shepherds Watched Their Flocks"

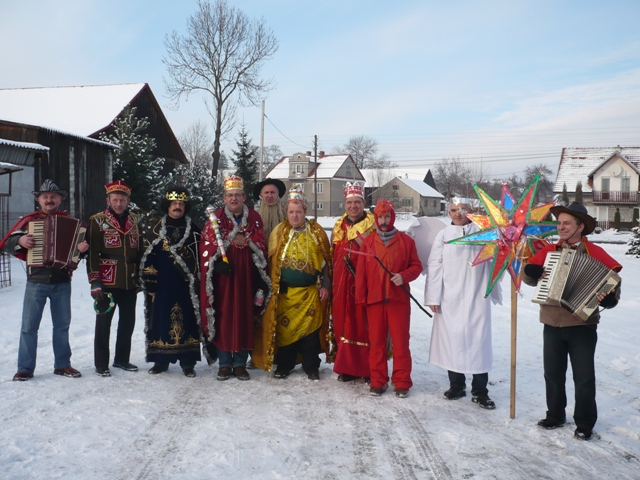
Carol singers in festive costume in Poland

These songs hearken from centuries ago, with the oldest (Wexford Carol) dating to the 12th century and the most recent dating to the mid-to-late 19th century.

=== Early secular Christmas songs ===
Among the earliest secular Christmas songs was "The Twelve Days of Christmas", which first appeared in 1780 in England, though its melody would not come until 1909. The English West Country carol "We Wish You a Merry Christmas" has antecedents dating to the 1830s but was not published in its modern form until Arthur Warrell introduced it to a wider audience in 1935. As the secular mythos of the holiday (such as Santa Claus in his modern form) emerged in the 19th century, so too did secular Christmas songs. Benjamin Hanby's "Up on the House Top" and Emily Huntington Miller's "Jolly Old Saint Nicholas" were among the first explicitly secular Christmas songs in the United States, both dating to the 1860s; they were preceded by "Jingle Bells", written in 1857 but not explicitly about Christmas, and "O Christmas Tree," written in 1824 but only made about a Christmas tree after being translated from its original German.

=== Published Christmas music ===
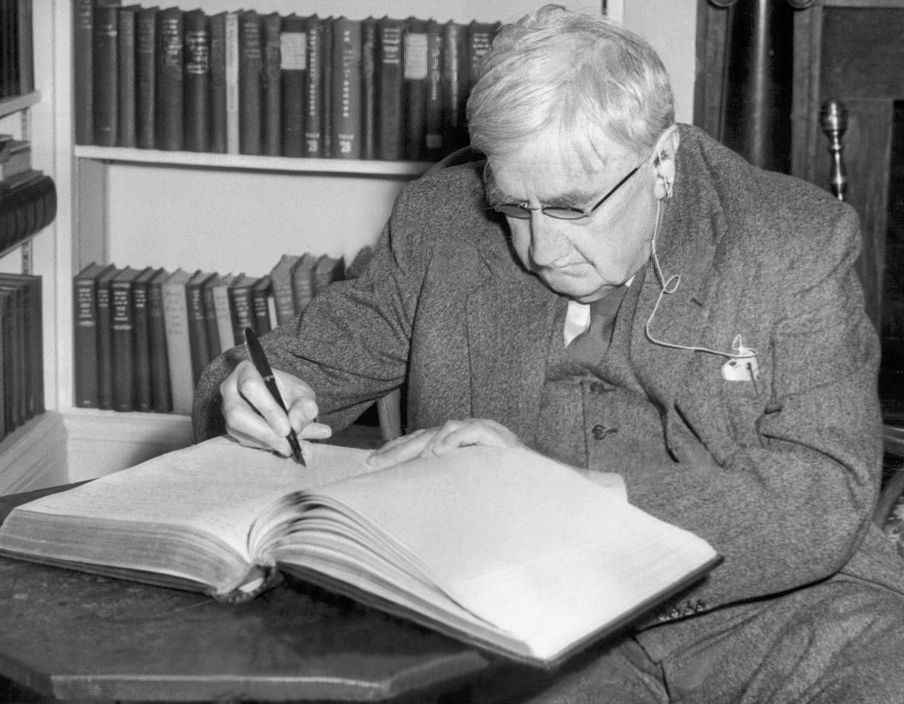
Ralph Vaughan Williams (1872–1958), a British composer who helped to popularise many medieval and folk carols for the modern age

Christmas music has been published as sheet music for centuries. One of the earliest collections of printed Christmas music was Piae Cantiones, a Finnish songbook first published in 1582 which contained a number of songs that have survived today as well-known Christmas carols. The publication of Christmas music books in the 19th century, such as Christmas Carols, New and Old (Bramley and Stainer, 1871), played an important role in widening the popular appeal of carols. In the 20th century, Oxford University Press (OUP) published some highly successful Christmas music collections such as The Oxford Book of Carols (Martin Shaw, Ralph Vaughan Williams and Percy Dearmer, 1928), which revived a number of early folk songs and established them as modern standard carols. This was followed by the bestselling Carols for Choirs series (David Willcocks, Reginald Jacques and John Rutter), first published in 1961 and now available in a five volumes. The popular books have proved to be a popular resource for choirs and church congregations in the English-speaking world, and remain in print today.

- Christmas Carols, New and Old (1871)
- Oxford Book of Carols (1928)
- Carols for Choirs (1961)
- New Oxford Book of Carols (1992)
- A Shorter New Oxford Book of Carols (1992)

=== Choirmasters poll ===
In 2008, BBC Music Magazine published a poll of the "50 Greatest Carols", compiled from the views of choral experts and choirmasters in the UK and the US. The resulting list of the top ten favored Christmas carols and motets was:

1. "In the Bleak Midwinter" – Harold Darke
2. "In Dulci Jubilo" – traditional
3. "A Spotless Rose" – Herbert Howells
4. "Bethlehem Down" – Peter Warlock
5. "Lully, Lulla" – traditional
6. "Tomorrow Shall Be My Dancing Day"
7. "There Is No Rose" - traditional (15th c.)
8. "O Come, All Ye Faithful"
9. "Of the Father's Heart Begotten"
10. "What Sweeter Music" – John Rutter

== Popular Christmas songs ==
=== United States ===
In 2018, NORC at the University of Chicago found that Americans have a preference for traditional Christmas carols over contemporary songs. In the same year, "Silent Night" was ranked as the most popular Christmas musical piece. According to the American Society of Composers, Authors and Publishers (ASCAP) in 2016, "Santa Claus Is Comin' to Town", written by Fred Coots and Haven Gillespie in 1934, is the most played holiday song of the last 50 years. It was first performed by Eddie Cantor, live, on his radio show in November 1934. Tommy Dorsey and his orchestra recorded their version in 1935, followed later by a range of artists including Frank Sinatra in 1948, The Supremes, The Jackson 5, The Beach Boys, and Glenn Campbell. Bruce Springsteen recorded a rock rendition in December 1975.

Long-time Christmas classics from prior to the "rock era" still dominate the holiday charts – such as "Let It Snow! Let It Snow! Let It Snow!", "Winter Wonderland", "Sleigh Ride" and "Have Yourself a Merry Little Christmas". Songs from the rock era to enter the top tier of the season's canon include "Wonderful Christmastime" by Paul McCartney, "All I Want for Christmas Is You" by Mariah Carey, and "Last Christmas" by Wham! Radio industry writer Sean Ross noted after the 2004 holiday season that it usually takes about ten years for a song to become a Christmas standard, noting in 2024 that this rule of thumb was still true based on early-to-mid-2010s songs such as "Santa Tell Me" by Ariana Grande and "Underneath the Tree" by Kelly Clarkson gaining perennial relevance. In 2025, Ross commented that the Elton John/Ed Sheeran collaboration "Merry Christmas," released in 2021, was the first record from the 2020s to begin gaining perennial traction.

The most popular set of these titles—heard over airwaves, on the Internet, in shopping malls, in elevators and lobbies, even on the street during the Christmas season—have been composed and performed from the 1930s onward. (Songs published before 1931 are all out of copyright, are no longer subject to ASCAP royalties and thus do not appear on their list.) In addition to Bing Crosby, major acts that have popularized and successfully covered a number of the titles in the top 30 most performed Christmas songs in 2015 include Frank Sinatra, Elvis Presley, Andy Williams, and the Jackson 5.

Since the mid-1950s, much of the Christmas music produced for popular audiences has explicitly romantic overtones, only using Christmas as a setting. The 1950s also featured the introduction of novelty songs that used the holiday as a target for satire and source for comedy. Exceptions such as "The Christmas Shoes" (2000) have re-introduced Christian themes as complementary to the secular Western themes, and myriad traditional carol cover versions by various artists have explored virtually all music genres. The 1980s and 1990s saw a revival of interest in instrumental Christmas music, including the New Age synthpop of Mannheim Steamroller and the symphonic metal of Trans-Siberian Orchestra, particularly among older listeners. Newer Christmas recordings found more difficulty gaining traction by the 2020s, due to several factors, among them Christmas playlists relying heavily on the standards, the decline of contemporary hit radio's influence on pushing new Christmas music (as adult contemporary music stations were the dominant destination for Christmas songs), and the major hitmaking stars not pushing Christmas records—nor having the dominance nor clout to do so—as much as their predecessors from the 1970s to the 1980s had. Syndicated contemporary hit radio host Mason Kelter surmised that the format's listeners had become averse to hearing Christmas music and turn to the format to get away from holiday records, contributing to there being fewer new Christmas records in the top 40 (this has also had the effect of causing a major divergence between the top 40 record charts and top 40 radio stations' playlists, as popular Christmas records regularly return to the charts each season).

==== Most-performed Christmas songs ====
"The world may have changed profoundly over the last 50 years, but these songs have been part of the holiday spirit for generations. Part of the wonder of music is how it helps us continue to create real memories and traditions. These treasured songs are very special to so many people and are a beloved part of ASCAP's repertoire."

— Paul Williams, President and chairman, American Society of Composers, Authors and Publishers (ASCAP)

The top thirty most-played holiday songs for the 2015 holiday season are ranked here, all titles written or co-written by ASCAP songwriters and composers.

Most of these songs in some way describe or are reminiscent of Christmas traditions, how Western Christian countries tend to celebrate the holiday, i.e., with caroling, mistletoe, exchanging of presents, a Christmas tree, feasting, jingle bells, etc. Celebratory or sentimental, and nostalgic in tone, they hearken back to simpler times with memorable holiday practices—expressing the desire either to be with someone or at home for Christmas. The winter-related songs celebrate the climatic season, with all its snow, dressing up for the cold, sleighing, etc.

Many titles help define the mythical aspects of modern Christmas celebration: Santa Claus bringing presents, coming down the chimney, being pulled by reindeer, etc. New mythical characters are created, defined, and popularized by these songs; "Rudolph the Red-Nosed Reindeer", adapted from a major retailer's promotional poem, was introduced to radio audiences by Gene Autry in 1949. His follow-up a year later introduced "Frosty the Snowman", the central character of his song. Though overtly religious, and authored (at least partly) by a writer of many church hymns, no drumming child appears in any biblical account of the Christian nativity scene. This character was introduced to the tradition by Katherine K. Davis in her "The Little Drummer Boy" (written in 1941, with a popular version being released in 1958).

The list does not include songs written before 1931 nor songs written solely by songwriters from other guilds such as BMI and SESAC.

Most performed Christmas songs in 2015 according to ASCAP
| Rank | Song | Composer(s) | Year | Type |
|---|---|---|---|---|
| 1 | "Santa Claus Is Comin' to Town" | J. Fred Coots, Haven Gillespie | 1934 | Mythical |
| 2 | "Have Yourself a Merry Little Christmas" | Ralph Blane, Hugh Martin | 1944 | Celebratory/Sentimental |
| 3 | "Winter Wonderland" | Felix Bernard, Richard B. Smith | 1934 | Seasonal |
| 4 | "Let It Snow! Let It Snow! Let It Snow!" | Sammy Cahn, Jule Styne | 1945 | Seasonal |
| 5 | "The Christmas Song" | Mel Tormé, Robert Wells | 1944 | Traditions |
| 6 | "Jingle Bell Rock" | Joseph Carleton Beal, James Ross Boothe | 1957 | Celebratory/Seasonal |
| 7 | "It's the Most Wonderful Time of the Year" | Edward Pola, George Wyle | 1963 | Seasonal/Traditions |
| 8 | "Sleigh Ride" | Leroy Anderson, Mitchell Parish | 1948 | Seasonal/Birthday |
| 9 | "Rudolph the Red-Nosed Reindeer" | Johnny Marks | 1939/1949 | Mythical |
| 10 | "It's Beginning to Look a Lot Like Christmas" | Meredith Willson | 1951 | Traditions/Celebratory |
| 11 | "White Christmas" | Irving Berlin | 1940 | Seasonal/Sentimental |
| 12 | "A Holly Jolly Christmas" | Johnny Marks | 1964/65 | Traditions/Celebratory |
| 13 | "Carol of the Bells" | Peter J. Wilhousky | 1936 | Celebratory |
| 14 | "Rockin' Around the Christmas Tree" | Johnny Marks | 1958 | Traditions |
| 15 | "All I Want for Christmas Is You" | Mariah Carey, Walter Afanasieff | 1994 | Sentimental |
| 16 | "Frosty the Snowman" | Steve Nelson, Walter E. Rollins | 1950 | Mythical |
| 17 | "Blue Christmas" | Billy Hayes, Jay W. Johnson | 1957 | Traditions |
| 18 | "(There's No Place Like) Home for the Holidays" | Bob Allen, Al Stillman | 1954 | Traditions/Sentimental |
| 19 | "The Little Drummer Boy" | Katherine K. Davis, Henry V. Onorati, Harry Simeone | 1941 | Christian-based |
| 20 | "Do You Hear What I Hear?" | Gloria Shayne Baker, Noël Regney | 1962 | Traditions |
| 21 | "Silver Bells" | Jay Livingston, Ray Evans | 1950 | Traditions |
| 22 | "Baby, It's Cold Outside" | Frank Loesser | 1948 | Seasonal |
| 23 | "I Saw Mommy Kissing Santa Claus" | Tommie Connor | 1952 | Novelty |
| 24 | "Feliz Navidad" | José Feliciano | 1970 | Celebratory |
| 25 | "Christmas Eve/Sarajevo 12/24" | Jon Oliva, Paul O'Neill, Robert Kinkel | 1995 | Historical fiction |
| 26 | "Last Christmas" | George Michael | 1984 | Sentimental |
| 27 | "Here Comes Santa Claus (Right Down Santa Claus Lane)" | Gene Autry, Oakley Haldeman | 1947 | Mythical/Christian-based |
| 28 | "Santa Baby" | Joan Ellen Javits, Tony Springer, and Fred Ebb | 1953 | Novelty |
| 29 | "Happy Holiday" | Irving Berlin | 1948 | Celebratory |
| 30 | "Wonderful Christmastime" | Paul McCartney | 1979 | Celebratory |

The above-ranking results from an aggregation of performances of all different artist versions of each cited holiday song, across all forms of media, from January 1, 2015, through December 31, 2015.

- Of the top 30 most performed Christmas songs in 2015, 13 (43%) were written in the 1930s or 1940s and 12 (40%) were written in the 1950s and 1960s; only five (17%) were written from the 1970s on, two (7%) were from after 1990, and none after 1995.
- The newest song in the top 30 most performed Christmas songs – "All I Want for Christmas is You", co-written and performed by Mariah Carey in 1994 – entered the list for the first time in 2015; the song hit the Billboard Hot 100 top 10 for the first time in 2017, and was named "the UK's favourite Christmas song" the same year by The Independent. Troy Powers and Andy Stone wrote a song with the same title and theme, which Stone's band Vince Vance & the Valiants recorded in 1989 and independently became popular the year before Carey's song. Stone has made multiple attempts to sue Carey over the similarity in name, which have to date been unsuccessful.
- Johnny Marks wrote three songs that appear in these most-performed Christmas songs in 2015: "Rudolph the Red-Nosed Reindeer", "Holly Jolly Christmas", and "Rockin' Around the Christmas Tree". Irving Berlin wrote two: "White Christmas" and "Happy Holiday". These are the only songwriters to appear on the list more than once – and both are Jewish.
- Gene Autry was the first to sing three songs on the list of top 30 most performed Christmas songs in 2015 – "Rudolph the Red-Nosed Reindeer", "Frosty the Snowman", and "Here Comes Santa Claus (Right Down Santa Claus Lane)" – co-writing the latter song.
- Two of the songs, "Carol of the Bells" and "Christmas Eve/Sarajevo 12/24", rely on the same melody, Mykola Leontovych's "Shchedryk", which was published in 1918 and is thus out of copyright, no longer subject to ASCAP royalties. The lyrics to "Carol of the Bells" are still under copyright. The copyright on "Christmas Eve/Sarajevo 12/24" extends only to the arrangement.
- "Tony Springer" was a pseudonym for Philip Springer. As Springer was a member of BMI at the time, he used the first name Tony as a legal fiction to allow himself to collaborate with ASCAP members Javits and Ebb.

=== Christmas song surveys ===
In 2007 surveys of United States radio listeners by two different research groups, the most liked songs were standards such as Bing Crosby's "White Christmas" (1942), Nat King Cole's "The Christmas Song" (1946), and Burl Ives' "A Holly Jolly Christmas" (1965). Other favorites like "Rockin' Around the Christmas Tree" (Brenda Lee, 1958), "Jingle Bell Rock" (Bobby Helms, 1957) and John Lennon and Yoko Ono's "Happy Xmas" (1971), scored well in one study. Also "loved" were Johnny Mathis's "Do You Hear What I Hear?" and Harry Simeone Chorale's "Little Drummer Boy" (1958).

Among the most-hated Christmas songs, according to Edison Media Research's 2007 survey, are Barbra Streisand's "Jingle Bells?", the Jackson 5's "Santa Claus Is Comin' to Town", Elmo & Patsy's "Grandma Got Run Over by a Reindeer", and "O Holy Night" as performed by cartoon characters from Comedy Central's South Park. The "most-hated Christmastime recording" is a rendition of "Jingle Bells" by Carl Weissmann's Singing Dogs, a revolutionary novelty song originally released in 1955, and re-released as an edited version in 1970. A 2004 focus group from Edison, conducted solely among the key demographic of women age 30 to 49, listed "Jingle Bells?," the Singing Dogs "Jingle Bells," the South Park "O Holy Night" rendition, a Guido parody of "The Twelve Days of Christmas," and "Blue Christmas" as performed by Porky Pig impersonator Seymour Swine.

Rolling Stone magazine ranked Darlene Love's version of "Christmas (Baby Please Come Home)" (1963) first on its list of The Greatest Rock and Roll Christmas Songs in December 2010. Carey's "All I Want for Christmas Is You", co-written by Carey and Walter Afanasieff, was No. 1 on Billboard's Holiday Digital Songs chart in December 2013. "Fairytale of New York" by The Pogues is cited as the best Christmas song of all time in various television, radio and magazine related polls in the United Kingdom and Ireland.

A 2021 YouGov survey of 1,000 adults ranked the most hated Christmas songs, counting only those songs that a majority of those polls recognized and listing the songs independent of any artist who may have recorded them. "Santa Baby" ranked atop the list; a side note from a news article covering the list noted that much of that hatred came from the Madonna cover version from A Very Special Christmas, which gets more airplay than Eartha Kitt's original. Other songs that ranked high in terms of listener revulsion included "I Saw Mommy Kissing Santa Claus," "Grandma Got Run Over by a Reindeer" and "Wonderful Christmastime".

==== Pinnacle Media Worldwide survey ====
The Pinnacle Media Worldwide survey divided its listeners into music-type categories:

- "Adult contemporary" listeners rated Brenda Lee's "Rockin' Around the Christmas Tree" best.
- "Adult Top 40" fans liked Bobby Helms' "Jingle Bell Rock".
- "Hip-hop/R&B" fans liked the Jackson 5's "Santa Claus Is Comin' to Town".
- "Country" listeners ranked Burl Ives' "A Holly Jolly Christmas" No. 1.
- "Smooth jazz" fans liked "The Christmas Song" as sung by Nat King Cole.

=== United Kingdom and Ireland ===
==== Most played songs ====
A collection of chart hits recorded in a bid to be crowned the UK Christmas No. 1 single during the 1970s and 1980s have become some of the most popular holiday tunes in the United Kingdom. Band Aid's 1984 song "Do They Know It's Christmas?" is the second-best-selling single in UK Chart history. "Fairytale of New York", released by The Pogues in 1987, is regularly voted the British public's favourite-ever Christmas song. It is also the most-played Christmas song of the 21st century in the UK. British glam rock bands had major hit singles with Christmas songs in the 1970s. "Merry Xmas Everybody" by Slade, "I Wish It Could Be Christmas Everyday" by Wizzard, and "Lonely This Christmas" by Mud all remain hugely popular.

In four out of the five years between 2008 and 2012, PRS for Music (who collect and pay royalties to its 75,000 song-writing and composing members) conducted a survey of the top ten most played Christmas songs in the UK over the past year, and published a top-ten list for each year except 2011 (the 2008 list was for the previous five years, and the 2009 measured the entire previous decade):

| Song title | Composer(s) | Performer(s) | Year | 2012 rank | 2010 rank | 2009 rank | 2008 rank |
|---|---|---|---|---|---|---|---|
| "Fairytale of New York" | Jem Finer and Shane MacGowan | The Pogues with Kirsty MacColl | 1987 | 1 | 3 | 2 | 3 |
| "All I Want for Christmas Is You" | Mariah Carey and Walter Afanasieff | Mariah Carey | 1994 | 2 | 1 | 1 | 4 |
| "Do They Know It's Christmas?" | Bob Geldof and Midge Ure | Band Aid | 1984 | 3 | 4 | 5 | 2 |
| "Last Christmas" | George Michael | Wham! | 1984 | 4 | 2 | 7 | 1 |
| "Santa Claus Is Comin' to Town" | John Frederick Coots, Haven Gillespie | Bruce Springsteen | 1981 | 5 | | | 5 |
| "Do You Hear What I Hear?" | Noel Regney, Gloria Shayn | Bing Crosby | 1962 | 6 | | | |
| "Happy Xmas (War Is Over)" | John Lennon | John Lennon | 1971 | 7 | | | |
| "Wonderful Christmastime" | Paul McCartney | Paul McCartney | 1979 | 8 | | 10 | |
| "I Wish It Could Be Christmas Everyday" | Roy Wood | Wizzard | 1973 | 9 | | | 7 |
| "Merry Xmas Everybody" | Noddy Holder, Jim Lea | Slade | 1973 | 10 | 5 | 3 | 8 |
| "White Christmas" | Irving Berlin | Bing Crosby | 1947 | | 6 | | 10 |
| "Driving Home for Christmas" | Chris Rea | Chris Rea | 1986 | | 7 | 6 | |
| "Merry Christmas Everyone" | Bob Heatlie | Shakin' Stevens | 1985 | | 8 | | |
| "Mistletoe and Wine" | Jeremy Paul, Leslie Stewart, Keith Strachan, Cliff Richard | Cliff Richard | 1988 | | 9 | | |
| "Walking in the Air" | Howard Blake | Aled Jones | 1985 | | 10 | | |
| "Stop the Cavalry" | Jona Lewie | Jona Lewie | 1980 | | | 4 | 6 |
| "I Believe in Father Christmas" | Greg Lake, Peter Sinfield, Sergei Prokofiev | Greg Lake | 1975 | | | 8 | |
| "Step into Christmas" | Elton John, Bernie Taupin | Elton John | 1973 | | | 9 | |
| "Lonely This Christmas" | Mike Chapman, Nicky Chinn | Mud | 1975 | | | | 9 |

The best Christmas song "to get adults and children in the festive spirit for the party season in 2016" was judged by the Daily Mirror to be "Fairytale of New York". Mariah Carey's "All I Want For Christmas is You" was declared "the UK's favourite Christmas song", narrowly beating out "Fairytale of New York" according to a "points system" created by The Independent in 2017. Both score well ahead of all others on the list of top twenty Christmas songs in the UK.

"The Christmas song is a genre in its own right . . More than any other type of music, it spans and links generations with disparate musical taste buds."

— Ellis Rich, Chairman of PRS for Music

==== Christmas Number Ones ====
The "Christmas Number One" – songs reaching the top spot on either the UK Singles Chart, the Irish Singles Chart, or occasionally both, on the edition preceding Christmas – is considered a major achievement in the United Kingdom and Ireland. The Christmas number one benefits from broad publicity, so much so that the songs that attempt but fail to achieve the honor and finish second also get widespread attention. Social media campaigns have been used to try to encourage sales of specific songs so that they could reach number one.

These songs develop an association with Christmas or the holiday season from their chart performance, but the association tends to be shorter-lived than for the more traditionally themed Christmas songs. Notable longer-lasting examples include Band Aid's "Do They Know It's Christmas?" (No. 1, 1984, the second-biggest selling single in UK Chart history; two re-recordings also hit No. 1 in 1989 and 2004), Slade's "Merry Xmas Everybody" (No. 1, 1973), and Wham!'s "Last Christmas" (No. 2, 1984). Last Christmas would go on to hold the UK record for highest-selling single not to reach No. 1, until it finally topped the chart on January 1, 2021, helped by extensive streaming in the final week of December 2020; it eventually reached Christmas number one in 2023.

The Beatles, Spice Girls, and LadBaby are the only artists to have achieved consecutive Christmas number-one hits on the UK Singles Chart, with LadBaby having the longest winning streak at five years. The Beatles won annually between 1963 and 1965 (with a fourth in 1967), the Spice Girls between 1996 and 1998, and LadBaby between 2018 and 2022 (all five of LadBaby's Christmas number-ones were parodies of other popular songs that included a running gag mentioning sausage rolls). "Bohemian Rhapsody" is the only recording to have ever been Christmas number one twice, in both 1975 and 1991. Three of the four different Band Aid recordings of "Do They Know It's Christmas?" have been number one in Christmas week.

At the turn of the 21st century, songs associated with reality shows became a frequent source of Christmas number ones in the UK. In 2002, Popstars: The Rivals produced the top three singles on the British Christmas charts. The "rival" groups produced by the series—the girl group Girls Aloud and the boy band One True Voice—finished first and second respectively on the charts. Failed contestants The Cheeky Girls charted with a novelty hit, "Cheeky Song (Touch My Bum)", at third. Briton Will Young, winner of the first Pop Idol, charted at the top of the Irish charts in 2003.

The X Factor also typically concluded in December during its run; the winner's debut single earned the Christmas number one in at least one of the two countries every year from 2005 to 2014, and in both countries in five of those ten years. Each year since 2008 has seen protest campaigns to outsell the X Factor single (which benefits from precisely timed release and corresponding media buzz) and prevent it from reaching number one. In 2009, as the result of a campaign intended to counter the phenomenon, Rage Against the Machine's 1992 single "Killing in the Name" reached number one in the UK instead of that year's X Factor winner, Joe McElderry. In 2011, "Wherever You Are", the single from a choir of military wives assembled by the TV series The Choir, earned the Christmas number-one single in Britain—upsetting X Factor winners Little Mix. With the Military Wives Choir single not being released in Ireland, Little Mix won Christmas number-one in Ireland that year.

=== Australia ===
Situated in the Southern Hemisphere, where seasons are reversed from the northern, the heat of early summer in Australia affects the way Christmas is celebrated and how Northern Hemisphere Christmas traditions are followed. Australians generally spend Christmas outdoors, going to the beach for the day, or heading to campgrounds for a vacation. International visitors to Sydney at Christmastime often go to Bondi Beach where tens of thousands gather on Christmas Day.

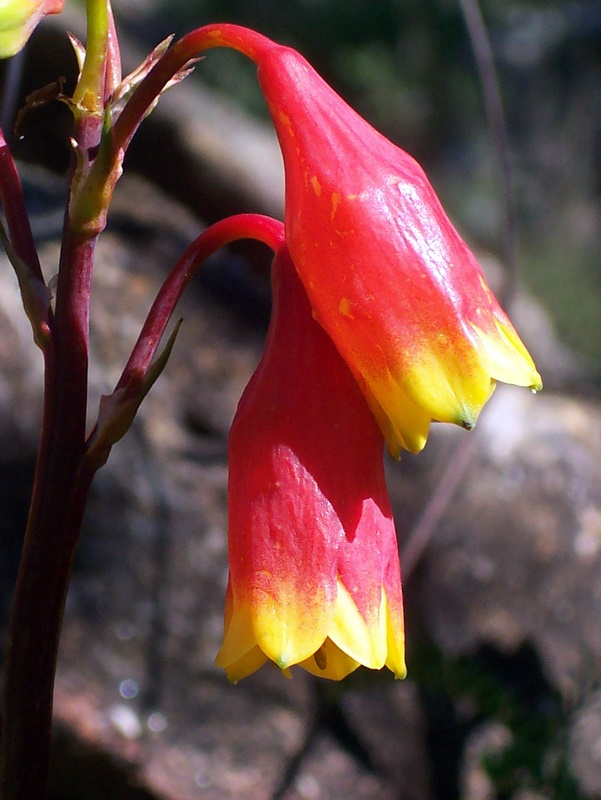
Blandfordia nobilis, or Christmas Bells, of eastern Australia

The tradition of an Australian Christmas Eve carol service lit by candles, started in 1937 by Victorian radio announcer Norman Banks, has taken place in Melbourne annually since then. Carols by Candlelight events can be "huge gatherings . . televised live throughout the country" or smaller "local community and church events." Carols in the Domain in Sydney is now a "popular platform for the stars of stage and music."

Some homegrown Christmas songs have become popular. William G. James' six sets of Australian Christmas Carols, with words by John Wheeler, include "The Three Drovers", "The Silver Stars are in the Sky", "Christmas Day", "Carol of the Birds" and others. "Light-hearted Australian Christmas songs" have become "an essential part of the Australian Christmas experience." Rolf Harris' "Six White Boomers", Colin Buchanan's "Aussie Jingle Bells", and the "Australian Twelve Days of Christmas", proudly proclaim the differing traditions Down Under. A verse from "Aussie Jingle Bells" makes the point:

Engine's getting hot
Dodge the kangaroos
Swaggie climbs aboard
He is welcome too
All the family is there
Sitting by the pool
Christmas Day, the Aussie way
By the barbecue!

"The Twelve Days of Christmas" has been revised to fit the Australian context, as an example: "On the twelfth day of Christmas, my true love sent to me: 12 parrots prattling, 11 numbats nagging, 10 lizards leaping, 9 wombats working, 8 dingoes digging, 7 possums playing, 6 brolgas dancing, 5 kangaroos, 4 koalas cuddling, 3 kookaburras laughing, 2 pink galahs, and an emu up a gum tree."

Other popular Australian Christmas songs include: 'White Wine in the Sun" by Tim Minchin, "Aussie Jingle Bells" by Bucko & Champs, "Christmas Photo" by John Williamson, "Go Santa, Go" by The Wiggles, and "Six White Boomers" by Russel Coight.

The Australian carols that do exist are mostly novelty re-workings of existing songs with the holly and the ivy replaced by gum trees and wattle. Santa swapping his fur hat for a corked Akubra and a token Aboriginal word is deemed sufficient to localise the celebration of the day a Middle Eastern tradesman wasn't actually born.

— Ben Anderson, Daily Review

"My Little Christmas Belle" (1909) composed by Joe Slater (1872–1926) to words by Ward McAlister (1872–1928) celebrates eastern Australian flora coming into bloom during the heat of Christmas. Blandfordia nobilis, also known as Christmas Bells, are the specific subject of the song—with the original sheet music bearing a depiction of the blossom. Whereas "The Holly and The Ivy" (1937) by Australian Louis Lavater (1867–1953) mentions northern hemisphere foliage.

Australian singer-songwriter Paul Kelly first released "How to Make Gravy" as part of a four-track EP November 4, 1996, through White Label Records. The title track, written by Kelly, tells the story in a letter to his brother from a newly imprisoned man who laments how he will be missing the family Christmas. It received a Song of the Year nomination at the 1998 Australasian Performing Right Association (APRA) Music Awards. Kelly's theme reflects a national experience with Christmas:

A lot of the early imagery of Christmas in Australia is related to isolation and distance. You've got the Sydney Mail in 1879 saying 'The revels of Christmas tide cannot endure the ordeal of immigration'. It's that sense that it's alien here and we're so conscious of being away from family and that figures very prominently in the imagery of Christmas back in that time.

— Nicholas Brown, Australian National University

=== Philippines ===
The Philippines, a tropical country, has a long tradition of Christmas music influenced by its climate and cultural traditions. Originally building from Spanish and American influences, Filipinos has developed its own Christmas music traditions. These began as far back as 1933, with carols written by Vicente D. Rubil and Levi Celerio. Most Filipino Christmas music is written in the Tagalog language, and some in English and other Philippine languages.

Most Filipino Christmas songs describe the local Christmas traditions and traditions such as caroling, parol, Simbang Gabi/Misa de Gallo, returning to one's hometown for the holidays and the Nochebuena. Songs can be celebratory or sentimental, with the sentimental songs aimed toward overseas Filipinos who long for the Christmas season in the Philippines. Other songs describe the Biblical narrative of Christmas or call to love and charity. The most popular Filipino Christmas song is Jose Mari Chan's "Christmas in Our Hearts". The success of that song led to a Christmas album from Chan with the same name, which went on to become the best-selling album in Original Pilipino Music (OPM) music with more than 800,000 albums sold.

Radio stations in the Philippines usually play Christmas music, both local and foreign, as early as September up to Christmas Day or New Year's Eve, but Philippine radio stations usually do not switch to an all-Christmas format, instead interspersing Christmas music onto their regular music programming. Major television networks in the Philippines also have a tradition of producing Christmas-themed station IDs, which take the form of promotional music videos, some of which became popular such as "Star ng Pasko" and "Thank You, Thank You, Ang Babait Ninyo" produced for ABS-CBN.

=== Other popular Christmas songs ===
"Jolly Old Saint Nicholas" originated with a poem by Emily Huntington Miller (1833–1913), published as "Lilly's Secret" in The Little Corporal Magazine December 1865. Lyrics have also been attributed to Benjamin Hanby, who wrote Up on the Housetop in 1864, but the words commonly heard today resemble Miller's 1865 poem. James R. Murray is attributed as composer in the first publication of the music in School Chimes, A New School Music Book by S. Brainard's Sons in 1874. Early notable recordings were made by Ray Smith (1949), Chet Atkins (1961), Eddy Arnold (1962), and Alvin and the Chipmunks (1963).

"I've Got My Love to Keep Me Warm", introduced in the musical film On the Avenue by Dick Powell and Alice Faye in 1937, was written by Irving Berlin. "The Little Boy that Santa Claus Forgot" – written by Michael Carr, Tommie Connor, and Jimmy Leach in 1937 – was notably performed by Vera Lynn and Nat King Cole. "I'll Be Home for Christmas", by lyricist Kim Gannon and composer Walter Kent, was recorded by Bing Crosby in 1943. "Merry Christmas Baby" is credited to Lou Baxter and Johnny Moore, whose group originally recorded it in 1947, featuring singer and pianist Charles Brown. Kay Thompson introduced her "The Holiday Season" in 1945, which later became part of a medley by Andy Williams. "A Marshmallow World" (sometimes called "It's a Marshmallow World") was written in 1949 by Carl Sigman (lyrics) and Peter DeRose (music).

More popular songs which reference the Nativity include "I Wonder as I Wander" (1933), "Mary's Boy Child" (1956), "Carol of the Drum" ("Little Drummer Boy") (1941), and "Do You Hear What I Hear?" (1962).

Other titles and recordings added to the popular Christmas song canon include:

==== 1950s ====
- 1950: "(Everybody's Waitin' for) The Man with the Bag", written by Irving Taylor and Dudley Brooks; popularized by Kay Starr.
- 1950: "Dixieland Band from Santa Claus Land" by Jimmy Dorsey and his orchestra.
- 1950: "A Marshmallow World", written by Carl Sigman and Peter DeRose; released by Bing Crosby (backed by The Lee Gordon Singers and the Sonny Burke Orchestra).
- 1950: "Mele Kalikimaka"; written in 1949 by R. Alex Anderson; released by Bing Crosby and The Andrews Sisters as a single (with "Poppa Santa Claus" on the reverse side). The title is the closest approximation of the pronunciation of "Merry Christmas" possible in the Hawaiian language.
- 1951: "Christmas Choir", released by Patti Page on Christmas with Patti Page.
- 1951: "Suzy Snowflake", written by Sid Tepper and Roy C. Bennett; released by Rosemary Clooney as a 78 RPM record through Columbia Records.
- 1953: "Up on the Housetop", written by Benjamin Hanby in 1864; popularized by Gene Autry.
- 1954: "The Christmas Waltz", written by Sammy Cahn and Jule Styne; released by Frank Sinatra on the B-side of his version of "White Christmas" and later A Jolly Christmas from Frank Sinatra (1957) and The Sinatra Family Wish You a Merry Christmas (1968).
- 1955: "The First Snowfall" written by Paul Francis Webster, Sonny Burke and recorded by Bing Crosby on November 22, 1955.
- 1956: "I Heard the Bells on Christmas Day", written by Johnny Marks from a Christmas carol based on the 1863 poem "Christmas Bells" by Henry Wadsworth Longfellow; released by Bing Crosby as a single (with "Christmas Is A-Comin' (May God Bless You)" on B-side).
- 1956: "Mary's Boy Child", written by Jester Hairston; released by Harry Belafonte on An Evening with Belafonte.
- 1957: "Mistletoe and Holly" written by Frank Sinatra, Dok Stanford, and Hank Sanicola; recorded by Sinatra with orchestra conducted by Gordon Jenkins, released as a Capitol 7" 45 single backed with "The Christmas Waltz". Included on A Jolly Christmas From Frank Sinatra.
- 1958: "Run Rudolph Run", written by Chuck Berry (though Johnny Marks successfully took songwriting credit on derivative work grounds in a lawsuit), released as a single on Chess Records.
- 1958 "The Chipmunk Song (Christmas Don't Be Late)", written by Ross Bagdasarian; who sang the Christmas carol, varying the tape speeds to produce high-pitched "chipmunk" voices, with the vocals credited to Alvin and the Chipmunks, Seville's cartoon virtual band[1] and later media franchise.
- 1958 "Rockin' Around the Christmas Tree," sung by Brenda Lee
- 1959: "Caroling, Caroling", written by Alfred Burt in 1953; recorded by Fred Waring on The Sounds of Christmas. Popularized by Nat King Cole on The Magic of Christmas in 1960.
- 1959: "The Secret of Christmas", written by Sammy Cahn and Jimmy Van Heusen for Bing Crosby, first performed in the film Say One for Me; Crosby recorded the song with an arrangement by Frank De Vol for a single that year released by Columbia Records.

==== 1960s ====
- .1960: "Please Come Home for Christmas", written by Charles Brown and Gene Redd; released by Brown on Charles Brown Sings Christmas Songs (since becoming associated with the Eagles' 1978 cover).
- 1960: "Must Be Santa", written by Hal Moore and Bill Fredericks; first released by Mitch Miller; Tommy Steele's cover of the song reaching No. 40 on the UK Singles Chart the same year.
- 1960: "Dominick the Donkey" written by Ray Allen, Wandra Merrell, and Sam Saltzberg; recorded by Lou Monte on Roulette Records. The song describes a donkey who helps Santa Claus bring presents ("made in Brooklyn") to children in Italy "because the reindeer cannot climb" Italy's hills.
- 1961: "Blue Holiday", recorded by The Shirelles. The song was featured in The Santa Clause 2.
- 1961: "The Merriest", "Christmas Heart", "Ring a Merry Bell" and "Seven Shades of Snow", all written of original compositions by Connie Pearce and Arnold Miller; recorded by June Christy on an unusual albumThis Time of Year.
- 1961: "We Wish You the Merriest", written and recorded by Les Brown; released by Frank Sinatra, Bing Crosby, and Fred Waring's Pennsylvanians on 12 Songs of Christmas in 1964.
- 1963: "Christmas (Baby Please Come Home)", written by Ellie Greenwich, Jeff Barry with Phil Spector; released by Darlene Love on A Christmas Gift for You from Phil Spector.
- 1963: "Happy Holidays/The Holiday Season" medley by Andy Williams of Irving Berlin's 1942 classic with Kay Thompson's "The Holiday Season" from 1945.
- 1963: "Little Saint Nick", written by Brian Wilson and Mike Love; released by the Beach Boys as a single and included on The Beach Boys' Christmas Album in 1964.
- 1963: "Pretty Paper" by Willie Nelson; sung by Roy Orbison. Nelson had a hit with his own song in 1978.
- 1964: "Silver and Gold", written by Johnny Marks; sung by Burl Ives on the Rankin-Bass Christmas special Rudolph the Red-Nosed Reindeer.
- 1964: "Toyland" written by Victor Herbert and Glen McDonough for the operetta Babes in Toyland (originally produced in 1903); released by Doris Day on The Doris Day Christmas Album.
- 1964: "Snowfall", written by Claude Thornhill in 1941, with lyrics later added by his wife, Ruth Thornhill; covered by Doris Day on The Doris Day Christmas Album.
- 1965: "Christmas Time Is Here", written for A Charlie Brown Christmas animated TV special; harmonized by the choir of St. Paul's Episcopal Church in San Rafael, California.
- 1965: "My Favorite Things", written by Richard Rodgers and Oscar Hammerstein for the 1959 musical, The Sound of Music; recorded by Diana Ross and the Supremes on Merry Christmas.
- 1965: "Santa Looked a Lot Like Daddy", written by Buck Owens and Don Rich; released by Owens as single with "All I Want for Christmas, Dear, Is You" on the B-side.
- 1966: "We Need a Little Christmas" written by Jerry Herman for the Broadway musical Mame, and first performed by Angela Lansbury in that 1966 production; popularly covered by Percy Faith & His Orchestra on Christmas Is... Percy Faith.
- 1966: "The Happiest Christmas Tree", written by Cathy Lynn; recorded by Nat King Cole.
- 1967: "Snoopy's Christmas", written by George David Weiss and Hugo & Luigi; released by the Royal Guardsmen on Snoopy and His Friends.
- 1967: "What Christmas Means to Me" written by Allen Story, Anna Gordy Gaye, and George Gordy; recorded by Stevie Wonder on Someday at Christmas.

==== 1970s ====
- 1970: "Give Love on Christmas Day", written by The Corporation (Berry Gordy, Alphonzo Mizell, Christine Perren, Freddie Perren, and Deke Richards); recorded by the Jackson 5 for The Jackson 5 Christmas Album.
- 1970: "Merry Christmas Darling", written by Richard Carpenter with lyrics by Frank Pooler; released by the Carpenters as a single (re-released 1974 & 1977); remixed on Christmas Portrait in 1978 with new vocal by Karen Carpenter.
- 1970: "This Christmas", written by Donny Hathaway (as "Donny Pitts") and Nadine Theresa McKinnor; recorded by Hathaway and released as a single (with "Be There" on the B-side).
- 1971: "My Christmas Card To You" released by the Partridge Family on A Partridge Family Christmas Card.
- 1971: "River" written by Joni Mitchell; released by her on Blue.
- 1973: "Step into Christmas", written by Elton John and Bernie Taupin; released by John as a stand-alone single (with "Ho! Ho! Ho! (Who'd Be A Turkey At Christmas" on B-side).
- 1974: "I Believe in Father Christmas" written by Greg Lake with lyrics by Peter Sinfield; released by Lake as a single (with "Humbug" on B-side). Instrumental riff between verses interpolated from "Troika" portion of Sergei Prokofiev's Lieutenant Kijé Suite, written for 1934 Soviet film, Lieutenant Kijé
- 1975: "A Spaceman Came Travelling", written by Christopher Davison; released under Davison's stage name Chris de Burgh as a single, taken from his album Spanish Train and Other Stories.
- 1976: "When a Child is Born" (original melody titled "Soleado"), written by Ciro Dammicco (alias "Zacar") and Dario Baldan Bembo in 1973 (English language lyrics written later by Fred Jay); released by Johnny Mathis as single entitled "When A Child Is Born (Soleado)" with "Every Time You Touch Me (I Get High)" on the B-side.
- 1977: "Celebrate Me Home", written by Kenny Loggins and Bob James; recorded by Loggins as title track of his debut solo album Celebrate Me Home.
- 1977: "Father Christmas", written by Ray Davies; released by the Kinks as a single (with "Prince of the Punks" on B-side).
- 1977: "Peace on Earth/Little Drummer Boy", "The Little Drummer Boy" written in 1941 by Katherine Kennicott Davis; "Peace on Earth" written by Ian Fraser, Larry Grossman, and Alan Kohan; medley recorded by David Bowie and Bing Crosby for the television special, Bing Crosby's Merrie Olde Christmas. (Bowie single released 1982.)
- 1978: "Mary's Boy Child – Oh My Lord", written by Jester Hairston in 1956 with new song by Frank Farian, Fred Jay, and Hela Lorin; medley released by Boney M as a single.
- 1978: "Please Come Home for Christmas", written by Charles Brown and Gene Redd in 1960; cover released by the Eagles as a single (with "Funky New Year" on B-side)
- 1979: "Grandma Got Run Over by a Reindeer"; written by Randy Brooks; released by Elmo & Patsy as a single (with "Christmas" on B-side).

==== 1980s ====
- 1980: "It Must Have Been The Mistletoe (Our First Christmas)", written by Doug Konecky and Justin Wilde; released by Barbara Mandrell on Christmas at Our House.
- 1980: "Same Old Lang Syne", written by Dan Fogelberg; released as a single by Folgelberg in 1980 (with "Hearts and Crafts" on B-side). It was included on his 1981 album The Innocent Age.
- 1980: "Stop The Cavalry" written by Jona Lewie; released by Lewie as a single (with "Laughing Tonight" on B-side).
- 1980: "Israel" written by Siouxsie and the Banshees, released as a single. (with "Red Over White" on B-side).
- 1981: "Christmas is the Time to Say 'I Love You'" written by Billy Squier; released by him by as the B-side of his hit, "My Kinda Lover".
- 1981: "Christmas Wrapping", written by Chris Butler; released by The Waitresses as a single (with "Christmas Fever" by Charlelie Couture on B-side). Also included in a Christmas compilation album.
- 1982: "Hard Candy Christmas"; written by Carol Hall for the musical, The Best Little Whorehouse in Texas; released by Dolly Parton as a single (with "Act Like a Fool" on B-side).
- 1984: "Another Rock and Roll Christmas"; written by Gary Glitter, Mike Leander and Edward Seago; released by Gary Glitter as a single, with the instrumental version as the B-side. The song had appeared earlier in the year on his 1984 album Boys Will Be Boys.
- 1984: "Thank God It's Christmas", written by Brian May and Roger Taylor; released by Queen as a single (with "Man on the Prowl" and "Keep Passing the Open Windows" on B-side).
- 1984: "Another Lonely Christmas", written by Prince; released by Prince and the Revolution as a single.
- 1984: "The Power of Love", written by Holly Johnson, Peter Gill, Mark O'Toole, and Brian Nash; released by Frankie Goes to Hollywood as a single (with "The World Is My Oyster" on B-side).
- 1985: "Merry Christmas Everyone"; written by Bob Heatlie; released by Shakin' Stevens as a single (with "With My Heart" and "Blue Christmas" on B-side).
- 1985: "There's a New Kid in Town", written by Don Cook, Curly Putman, and Keith Whitley.
- 1987: "Christmas in Hollis", written by Joseph Simmons, Darryl McDaniels, and Jason Mizell; released by Run D.M.C. on two Christmas compilation albums: A Very Special Christmas and Christmas Rap, and as a single (with "Peter Piper" on B-side).
- 1988: "Driving Home for Christmas"; written by Chris Rea; originally released as one of two new songs on Rea's first compilation album New Light Through Old Windows in October, then issued as the fourth single from the album in December.
- 1988: "Mistletoe and Wine", written by Jeremy Paul, Leslie Stewart and Keith Strachan for the 1976 musical, Scraps (an adaptation of Hans Christian Andersen's "The Little Match Girl"); released by Cliff Richard as a single (with "Marmaduke" on B-side), and on his album Private Collection: 1979–1988.
- 1989: "All I Want for Christmas Is You", written by Troy Powers and Andy Stone; released by Vince Vance & The Valiants as a single.
- 1989: "Merry Christmas (I Don't Want to Fight Tonight)" by The Ramones on their Brain Drain album.

==== 1990s ====
- 1990: "Saviour's Day", written by Chris Eaton; released by Cliff Richard as a single (with "Where You Are" on B-side).
- 1990: "Grown-Up Christmas List", written by David Foster, Linda Thompson-Jenner, and Amy Grant; released by David Foster with Natalie Cole for his album River of Love (with a 1992 version by Amy Grant).
- 1991: "Mary, Did You Know?", with lyrics written by Mark Lowry (in 1984) and music by Buddy Greene; originally recorded by Michael English on a self-titled album (with a 1996 version by Kenny Rogers and Wynona Judd).
- 1992: "All Alone on Christmas", written and arranged by Steve Van Zandt; recorded by Darlene Love as a single with members of The E Street Band and The Miami Horns. Originally featured on Home Alone 2: Lost in New York soundtrack.
- 1992: "Christmas All Over Again" by Tom Petty and the Heartbreakers on the album box set Playback
- 1993: "Hey Santa!", written (with the help of Jack Kugell) and sung by Carnie and Wendy Wilson on the album of the same name.
- 1994: "The Chanukah Song"; written by Adam Sandler, Lewis Morton, and Ian Maxtone-Graham; originally performed by Sandler on Saturday Night Live's Weekend Update segment on December 3, 1994. Released as a single by Sandler in 1995 from What the Hell Happened to Me?.
- 1996: "How to Make Gravy" written and performed by Paul Kelly in Australia.
- 1998: "Christmas Canon" by the Trans-Siberian Orchestra on their album The Christmas Attic
- 1998: "Merry Christmas, Happy Holidays" by NSYNC from the albums Home for Christmas and The Winter Album

==== 2000s ====
- 2000: "My Only Wish (This Year)" by Britney Spears off the compilation album, Platinum Christmas
- 2000: "Where Are You, Christmas?" co-written by Mariah Carey, James Horner, and Will Jennings, but recorded by Faith Hill. The song was originally recorded by Carey, but because of a legal case with her ex-husband Tommy Mottola, it could not be released, so it was re-recorded and released by Faith Hill.
- 2002: "Maybe This Christmas" by Ron Sexsmith from the compilation album of the same name.
- 2003: "Christmas Time (Don't Let the Bells End)" by The Darkness
- 2004: "Believe" written by Glen Ballard and Alan Silvestri for Josh Groban
- 2004: "Joseph's Lullaby" by MercyMe from the album The Christmas Sessions
- 2004: "Wizards in Winter", an instrumental written and composed by Paul O'Neill and Robert Kinkel, performed by the Trans-Siberian Orchestra
- 2007: "Mistletoe" written by Stacy Blue and Colbie Caillat, and performed by Caillat.
- 2008: "White Is in the Winter Night" by Enya on the album, And Winter Came...
- 2009: "It Doesn't Often Snow at Christmas" by Pet Shop Boys (UK No. 40 hit)

==== 2010s ====
- 2010: "Oh Santa!" by Mariah Carey from her album Merry Christmas II You. A new version, featuring Ariana Grande and Jennifer Hudson, was released in 2020 for the Mariah Carey's Magical Christmas Special's soundtrack.
- 2010: "Christmas Lights" by Coldplay
- 2010: "Christmas in Harlem" by Kanye West from the GOOD Fridays series of releases under the GOOD Music label
- 2011: "Mistletoe" by Justin Bieber from his album Under the Mistletoe
- 2012: "Christmas in the Sand" by Colbie Caillat from her album of the same name; meant to conjure up (humorously) what Christmas might be like in Hawaii
- 2013: "Underneath the Tree" by Kelly Clarkson on her album Wrapped in Red
- 2013: "One More Sleep" by Leona Lewis on her album Christmas, with Love
- 2013: "Wrapped in Red" written by Kelly Clarkson, Ashley Arrison, Aben Eubanks, and Shane McAnally and recorded by Clarkson as the opening track on her sixth studio album, Wrapped in Red
- 2014: "That's Christmas to Me" by a cappella group Pentatonix (No. 2 Billboard 200, double platinum by RIAA)
- 2014: "Santa Tell Me" by Ariana Grande on her EP Christmas Kisses
- 2015: "Every Day's Like Christmas" by Kylie Minogue on her album Kylie Christmas
- 2017: "Santa's Coming for Us" written by Sia and Greg Kurstin and released by Sia on Everyday Is Christmas
- 2017: "Snowman" written by Sia and Greg Kurstin and released by Sia on Everyday Is Christmas
- 2019: "Christmas Tree Farm" by Taylor Swift

==== 2020s ====
- 2020 "Holiday" by Lil Nas X
- 2020: "Christmas Saves the Year" a single written and recorded by Twenty One Pilots; released after a Twitch stream where lead singer Tyler Joseph played in a Fortnite tournament sponsored by Chipotle in hopes to raise money for Make-A-Wish Foundation.
- 2021: "Merry Christmas" by Ed Sheeran and Elton John
- 2023: "DJ Play a Christmas Song" by Cher
- 2023: "Dear Santa" by OneRepublic
- 2024: "Christmas Magic" a single written and recorded by Laufey; created and released for the film Red One
- 2025: "The Apple White Carol (Christmas Be The Fairest)" a single written and produced by David Lawrence; inspired by Ever After High, a fashion doll line by Mattel. It centers on the character Apple White, the daughter of Snow White, and her mission to make Christmas "the fairest of them all".
- 2026: "take me home (4 christmas)," Olivia Rodrigo's official debut holiday single centered around a relatable, nerve-wracking relationship milestone.

=== Christmas songs from musicals ===
"I've Got My Love to Keep Me Warm", written by Irving Berlin, was introduced in the musical film On the Avenue by Dick Powell and Alice Faye in 1937. "White Christmas" was introduced in the film Holiday Inn (1942) and would itself inspire a titular musical film White Christmas (1954), while "Have Yourself a Merry Little Christmas" was from Meet Me in St. Louis (1944), and "Silver Bells" was originally featured in The Lemon Drop Kid (1950). The operetta Babes in Toyland (1903) featured the song "Toyland". The 1934 film adaptation, a Laurel and Hardy musical film known by alternative titles, opened with the song. Introducing Christmas-themed songs that have yet to achieve popularity, Scrooge (1970) included "Father Christmas", "December the 25th", and the Academy Award-nominated "Thank You Very Much".

"Mistletoe and Wine" was written for a 1976 musical entitled Scraps, which was an adaptation of Hans Christian Andersen's "The Little Match Girl;" it underwent substantial revision for Cliff Richard's 1988 version. "Hard Candy Christmas" was written by Carol Hall for the 1982 musical, The Best Little Whorehouse in Texas, and later released by Dolly Parton (who starred in the film version) as a single. Tim Burton's The Nightmare Before Christmas (1993) features Christmas-themed songs like "Making Christmas", "What's This?", "Town Meeting Song", and "Jack's Obsession". Jersey Boys adapted the Four Seasons' U.S. and UK number-one hit "December, 1963 (Oh, What a Night)," which had been originally released in the 1975 Christmas season and was set in "late December," into an explicitly Christmas-themed song.

In 2010, the hit movie Elf premiered on Broadway featuring an amazing Christmas hit, "Sparklejollytwinklejingley." In 2011, a musical came out called Catch Me If You Can about Frank Abagnale Jr., and it features a song called, "Chrismas is My Favorite Time of Year." In 2012, a Benj Pasek and Justin Paul Christmas musical was released. It was based off the movie, "A Christmas Story," and featured songs like, "Counting Down to Christmas," and, "You'll Shoot Your Eye Out."

=== Christmas novelty songs ===
Musical parodies of the season – comical or nonsensical songs performed principally for their comical effect – are often heard around Christmas. Many novelty songs employ unusual lyrics, subjects, sounds, or instrumentation, and may not even be particularly musical. The term arose in the Tin Pan Alley world of popular songwriting, with novelty songs achieving great popularity during the 1920s and 1930s.

The Christmas novelty song genre, which got its start with "I Yust Go Nuts at Christmas" written by Yogi Yorgesson and sung by him with the Johnny Duffy Trio in 1949, includes such notable titles as:

- "Jingle Bells" by the Singing Dogs was recorded in 1955 by Don Charles from Copenhagen; considered the work of Carl Weismann, it was revolutionary in its use of the latest recording technology.
- "Green Chri$tma$", a radio play parody by Stan Freberg that came out in 1958 and satirized commercial advertising.
- "I'm Gonna Spend My Christmas with a Dalek," released in 1964 by an otherwise-obscure band named The Go-Go's (unrelated to the later American band of the same name). Originally intended to help fuel Dalekmania, it tried to turn the Daleks, a murderous race of aliens hellbent on exterminating everything in their path who were featured in the Doctor Who franchise, into another version of The Chipmunks.
- "Santa Looked a Lot Like Daddy", co-written and recorded by Buck Owens in 1965, has been covered by other country music stars, including Garth Brooks, Travis Tritt, and Brad Paisley.

In the 1970s comedic singing duo Cheech & Chong's debut single in 1971 was "Santa Claus and His Old Lady". The Kinks did "Father Christmas" in 1977, and Elmo & Patsy came out with "Grandma Got Run Over by a Reindeer" in 1979. More recent titles added to the canon include:

- "The Twelve Days of Christmas" parodies (including one by Bob and Doug McKenzie in 1982)
- "Christmas at Ground Zero" by Weird Al Yankovic (1986)
- "Rusty Chevrolet" by Da Yoopers, a parody of "Jingle Bells" (1987)
- "Christmas in Hollis", a rap single by Run–D.M.C. (1987)
- A Rubber Band Christmas – an entire album featuring traditional and popular Christmas songs played on rubber bands, staplers and other office equipment (1996)
- "Christmas Convoy", a southern rock song by Paul Brandt, a parody of the C.W. McCall song "Convoy" (2006)
- "Dick in a Box", a 1990s R&B-style song written by The Lonely Island and Justin Timberlake that premiered on Saturday Night Live (2009)

Seattle radio personality Bob Rivers became nationally famous for his line of novelty Christmas songs and released five albums (collectively known as the Twisted Christmas quintilogy, after the name of Rivers' radio program, Twisted Radio) consisting entirely of Christmas parodies from 1987 to 2002. "Don't Shoot Me Santa" was released by The Killers in 2007, benefiting various AIDS charities. Christmas novelty songs can involve gallows humor and even morbid humor like that found in "Christmas at Ground Zero" and "The Night Santa Went Crazy", both by "Weird Al" Yankovic. The Dan Band released several adult-oriented Christmas songs on their 2007 album Ho: A Dan Band Christmas which included "Ho, Ho, Ho" (ho being slang for a prostitute), "I Wanna Rock You Hard This Christmas", "Please Don't Bomb Nobody This Holiday" and "Get Drunk & Make Out This Christmas".

Kristen Bell and a cappella group Straight No Chaser "teamed up to poke fun at the modern seasons greeting" with "Text Me Merry Christmas":

Text me Merry Christmas
Let me know you care
Just a word or two
Of text from you
Will remind me you're still there

Straight No Chaser singer Randy Stine said of the song: "We wanted a Christmas song that spoke to how informal communication has become."

==== Juvenile ====
Christmas novelty songs include many sung by young teens, or performed largely for the enjoyment of a young audience. Starting with "I Saw Mommy Kissing Santa Claus" sung by 13-year-old Jimmy Boyd in 1952, a few other notable novelty songs written to parody the Christmas season and sung by young singers include:

- "I Want a Hippopotamus for Christmas" sung by 10-year-old Gayla Peevey (1953)
- "Nuttin' for Christmas" by Art Mooney and Barry Gordon, who was seven years old when he sang it (1955)
- "¿Dónde Está Santa Claus? (Where is Santa Claus?)" sung by 12-year-old Augie Rios, featuring the Mark Jeffrey Orchestra (1959)

Christmas novelty songs aimed at a young audience include:

- "All I Want for Christmas Is My Two Front Teeth", written by Donald Yetter Gardner in 1944 and introduced by Spike Jones and his City Slickers (1948)
- "I Saw Mommy Kissing Santa Claus" with music and lyrics by British songwriter Tommie Connor was first recorded by 13-year-old Jimmy Boyd in 1952, reaching No. 1 on the Billboard pop singles chart in December of that year. The Jackson 5 recorded a popular cover in 1970 with a young Michael Jackson singing lead.
- "The Chipmunk Song", written by Ross Bagdasarian Sr./David Seville and performed by Alvin and the Chipmunks (1958)
- "You're a Mean One, Mr. Grinch" originally done for the 1966 cartoon special How the Grinch Stole Christmas!; lyrics written by Dr. Seuss, music by Albert Hague, and performed by Thurl Ravenscroft
- "Snoopy's Christmas" performed by The Royal Guardsmen in 1967; a follow-up to their earlier song "Snoopy Vs. The Red Baron" recorded in 1966
- "Santa Claus Is a Black Man" by Akim and the Teddy Vann Production Company (1973)

The number of Christmas novelty songs is so vast that radio host Dr. Demento devotes an entire month of weekly two-hour episodes to the format each year, and the novelty songs receive frequent requests at radio stations across the country.

=== Non-Christian writers ===
Approximately half of the 30 best-selling Christmas songs by ASCAP members in 2015 were written by Jewish composers. Johnny Marks has three top Christmas songs, the most for any writer—"Rudolph the Red-Nosed Reindeer", "Rockin' Around the Christmas Tree", and "A Holly Jolly Christmas". By far the most recorded Christmas song is "White Christmas" by Irving Berlin (born Israel Isidore Beilin in Russia)—who also wrote "Happy Holiday"—with well over 500 versions in dozens of languages.

Others include:

- "Let It Snow! Let It Snow! Let It Snow!" by Sammy Cahn (born Cohen) and Jule Styne (who also wrote "The Christmas Waltz" together)
- "Winter Wonderland" (composer Felix Bernard was born Felix William Bernhardt)
- "The Christmas Song (Chestnuts Roasting on an Open Fire)" by Robert Wells (born Levinson) and Mel Tormé
- "Sleigh Ride" (lyricist Mitchell Parish was born Michael Hyman Pashelinsky in Lithuania)
- "It's the Most Wonderful Time of the Year" (composer George Wyle was born Bernard Weissman)
- "Silver Bells" by Jay Livingston (born Jacob Levinson) and Ray Evans
- "(There's No Place Like) Home for the Holidays" by Bob Allen (born Robert Allen Deitcher) and Al Stillman (born Albert Silverman)
- "I'll Be Home for Christmas" by Walter Kent (born Walter Kauffman) and Buck Ram (born Samuel).
- "Santa Baby" by Joan Ellen Javits (Zeeman), niece of Senator Jacob Javits, and Philip Springer.
- "Baby, It's Cold Outside" by Frank Loesser

Lyricist Jerome "Jerry" Leiber and composer Mike Stoller wrote "Santa Claus Is Back in Town", which Elvis Presley debuted on his first Christmas album in 1957. "Christmas (Baby Please Come Home)" was written by Ellie Greenwich and Jeff Barry (with Phil Spector), originally for Ronnie Spector of The Ronettes. It was made into a hit by Darlene Love in 1963.

"Peace on Earth" was written by Ian Fraser, Larry Grossman, and Alan Kohan as a counterpoint to "The Little Drummer Boy" (1941) to make David Bowie comfortable recording "Peace on Earth/Little Drummer Boy" with Bing Crosby on September 11, 1977 – for Crosby's then-upcoming television special, Bing Crosby's Merrie Olde Christmas.

== Adopted Christmas music ==
What is known as Christmas music today, coming to be associated with the holiday season in some way, has often been adopted from works initially composed for other purposes. Many tunes adopted into the Christmas canon carry no Christmas connotation at all. Some were written to celebrate other holidays and gradually came to cover the Christmas season.

- "Tempus Adest Floridum", a romantic spring carol with Latin words dating to the 13th-century Carmina Burana and a melody attested no later than 1584, became associated with Christmas after John Mason Neale set his epic ballad "Good King Wenceslas" to its melody in 1853. Neale's poem does not directly mention Christmas or the nativity but describes Bohemian Duke Wenceslas I's journey to aid a poor traveler on a cold Saint Stephen's Day; that day falls on the day after Christmas and within the traditional Twelve Days of Christmas.
- "Joy to the World", with words written by Isaac Watts in 1719 and music by Lowell Mason (who in turn borrowed liberally from Handel) in 1839, was originally written anticipating the Second Coming.
- "Jingle Bells", first published under the title "One Horse Open Sleigh" in 1857, was originally associated with Thanksgiving rather than Christmas.
- With a Welsh melody dating back to the sixteenth century, and English lyrics from 1862, "Deck the Halls" celebrates the pagan holiday of Yule and the New Year, but not explicitly Christmas ("Troll the ancient Yuletide carol/See the blazing Yule before us/While I tell of Yuletide treasure").

"Shchedryk", a Ukrainian tune celebrating the arrival of springtime, was adapted in 1936 with English lyrics to become the Christmas carol "Carol of the Bells" and in 1995 as the heavy-metal instrumental "Christmas Eve/Sarajevo 12/24." "When You Wish Upon a Star", an Academy Award-winning song about dreams, hope, and magic featured in Walt Disney's Pinocchio (1940). What later became the main theme for Disney studios was sung by Cliff Edwards, who voiced Jiminy Cricket in the film. In Scandinavian countries and Japan, the song is used in reference to the Star of Bethlehem and the "ask, and it will be given to you" discourse in Matthew 7:7–8; in the movie it is in reference to the Blue Fairy.

Many popular Christmas tunes of the 20th-century mention winter imagery, leading to their being adopted into the Christmas and holiday season. These include:

- "Winter Wonderland" (1934)
- "I've Got My Love to Keep Me Warm" (1937)
- "Baby, It's Cold Outside" (1944)
- "A Marshmallow World" (1949)
- "Jingle Bell Rock" (1957)
- "My Favorite Things" (1959)

"Do You Want to Build a Snowman?" (2013), from the movie Frozen, features lyrics that are more of an illustration of the relationship between the two main characters than a general description of winter or the holidays, but its title rhetoric and the winter imagery used throughout the film have led it to be considered a holiday song.

"Sleigh Ride", composed originally in 1948 as an instrumental by Leroy Anderson, was inspired by a heatwave in Connecticut. The song premiered with the Boston Pops Orchestra in May 1948 with no association with Christmas. The lyrics added in 1950 have "nothing to do with Santa, Jesus, presents or reindeer," but the jingling bells and "sleigh" in the title made it a natural Christmas song. Lyricist Sammy Cahn and composer Jule Styne also found themselves in a heatwave in July 1945 when they wrote "Let It Snow! Let It Snow! Let It Snow!", inserting no reference to Christmas in the song. "Holiday" (2010) is about the summer holidays, but has been used in some Christmas ad campaigns.

Perry Como famously sang Franz Schubert's setting of "Ave Maria" in his televised Christmas special each year, including the song on The Perry Como Christmas Album (1968). The song, a prayer to the Virgin Mary (quoted from the Gospel of Luke) sung in Latin, would become a "staple of family holiday record collections." American a capella group Pentatonix released their version of "Hallelujah", the 1984 song written by Leonard Cohen and covered famously by a number of acts, on their Christmas album shortly before the songwriter's death in 2016. Besides the title, and several biblical (Old Testament) references, the song contains no connection to Christmas or the holidays per se; an earlier 2014 rewrite introduced by Cloverton repurposed the tune and some of Cohen's lyrics to make it more explicitly Christian and Christmas-themed. Various versions have been added to Christmas music playlists on radio stations in the United States and Canada.

In the United Kingdom, songs not explicitly tied to Christmas are popularly played during the year-end holidays. "Stop the Cavalry", written and performed by English musician Jona Lewie in 1980, was intended as a war protest, which his record label was unwilling to release in its original form. The label reworked the record, added a tubular bell and a brass band sound, and built upon a throwaway line about wanting to be "home for Christmas" to make the song a Christmas song.

== Radio broadcasting of Christmas music ==
In the United States, it is common for local radio stations to gradually begin adding Christmas music to their regular playlists in late-November, typically after Thanksgiving (which is generally considered the official start of the holiday season), and sometimes culminating with all-Christmas music by Christmas itself. More prominently, some stations temporarily drop their regular music format entirely and switch exclusively to Christmas music for the holiday season, a practice that emerged in 2001.

== See also ==
- Best-selling Christmas/holiday singles in the United States
- Christmas music radio
- List of Christmas albums
- List of Christmas carols
- List of Christmas hit singles in the United Kingdom
- List of Christmas hit singles in the United States
- List of best-selling Christmas/holiday albums in the United States
- Billboard Christmas Holiday Charts
- Epiphany music
- Parang
- Chutney parang
- Parranda
- Villancico
