= The Hotshots =

British ska band

- Genres: Ska
- Years active: 1973
- Label: Mooncrest Records
- Past members: Clive Crawley (vocals); Brian Bennett (keyboards); The Cimarons: Franklyn Dunn (bass); Carl Levy (keyboards); Locksley Gichie (guitar); Maurice Ellis (drums); Wild Country: Alan Kanter (bass); Pete Dye (guitar); Kelvin Purcell (drums); Albatross: Terry Keyworth (vocals, guitar); Danny Balkwill (bass); John "Joe" Jones (guitar); Malcolm Player (drums)

The Hotshots was a ska band which had a hit single in the UK singles charts with a cover of "Snoopy vs. the Red Baron" in 1973.

== History ==
In Spring 1973, the head of Mooncrest Records, Clive Crawley, decided to record a cover of the Royal Guardsmen's hit "Snoopy vs. the Red Baron" as a counter to the heavy metal that was becoming popular. Crawley got together with the label's regular session keyboardist, Brian Bennett, and, in order to create a lilting ska sound, hired an Anglo-Jamaican band, the Cimarons, to provide the appropriate rhythm.

The recording, released on 4 May 1973 under the group name the Hotshots, entered the UK Singles Chart for the week ending 2 June 1973, and peaked at no. 4 for the week ending 14 July 1973. However, rather than use the Cimarons to promote the single, Crawley recruited a different band - Wild Country - which twice appeared on Top of the Pops performing the song.

As the single dropped out of the charts, Wild Country, which did not have the rights to the Hotshots name, recorded a follow-up single ("Here Come the Three Bears") under the name the Hi-Shots, with Cliff Bennett as lead singer. Brian Bennett recruited a new band, Albatross, to be the Hotshots; this different combine recorded four further ska singles as the Hotshots, as well as an album, but none was a hit, and Albatross reverted to recording under their own name.

== Discography ==
=== Albums ===
Year	Album	UK
1973	Snoopy vs. the Red Baron	–

=== Singles ===
Year	Song	UK
1973	"Snoopy vs. the Red Baron"	4
1973	"Battle of New Orleans"	–
1973	"Yesterday Man"	–
1974	"Caribbean"	–
1975	"Mellow Yellow"	–
"–" denotes releases that did not chart.
