= Snoopy and His Friends =

Studio album by The Royal Guardsmen
- Released: 1967
- Label: Laurie

The Royal Guardsmen chronology
The Return of the Red Baron (1967)	Snoopy and His Friends (1967)	Snoopy for President (1968)

Back cover

Snoopy and His Friends is the third album by the Ocala, Florida group The Royal Guardsmen.

The group is best known for their hit recording of "Snoopy vs. the Red Baron", which was first released in 1967 as a 45 rpm record single (it reached No. 2 in the US and No. 8 in the UK) and had previously been released as the title track to their debut album; both it and its follow-up "The Return of the Red Baron" were re-released on this album. The song "Snoopy's Christmas", introduced on this album, is still played somewhat during the Christmas season. All three songs constitute side A of Snoopy and His Friends.

Two singles were released from the album: the aforementioned "Snoopy's Christmas" and "I Say Love." The latter, a non-Snoopy-themed song, reached number 72 on the Billboard Hot 100. Also in Billboard, it reached number 11 on the top selling Christmas LPs of 1967.

Charles Schulz, creator of the Peanuts comic strip (and the Snoopy character), drew the album artwork. He agreed to contribute artwork and allow the group to release the record in exchange for a cut of the royalties.

== Track listing ==
- Side 1
  1. The Story of Snoopy Vs. the Red Baron
  2. The Story of the Return of the Red Baron
  3. The Story of Snoopy's Christmas
- Side 2
  1. I Say Love
  2. Down Behind the Lines
  3. It's Sopwith Camel Time
  4. So Right
  5. Airplane Song (My Airplane)
  6. It Kinda Looks Like Christmas
