= A Rubber Band Christmas =

Studio album by The Rubberband Band
- Released: 1996, 2000
- Genres: Novelty, Christmas music
- Length: 23:27
- Label: CD Freedom/Artist Development Associates

A Rubber Band Christmas is a 1996 instrumental Christmas novelty album featuring traditional and popular Christmas songs played entirely on rubber bands, staplers and other office equipment. The album is noted for its comic effects and has been described as one of the "weirdest" and most novel releases of its type.

== Description ==
The album came about when two artists, Jeff St. Pierre and Philip Antoniades, found themselves bored one evening at the office and began creating Christmas music out of rubber bands, staplers, tape and other office supplies to hand. After entertaining themselves through the night with this diversion, they forwarded the results as a "seasonal thank you" to friends and associates. The recording was sufficiently well received that Artist Development Associates of Framingham, Massachusetts, decided to release it as a CD, under the title A Rubber Band Christmas, with St. Pierre and Antoniades going by the name "The Rubberband Band". The CD was re-released on October 24, 2000.

The album's fourteen tracks typically feature a rubber band twanging out the melody, while a ruler struck at different lengths adds a bass accompaniment. Rhythm is sometimes supplied through the use of "quickly-yanked frosty tape". The tracks featured are a selection of traditional and popular Christmas carols and ballads, with the word "rubber" substituted at some point in the title, yielding names such as "Rubber Bells" (for Jingle Bells), "Rudolph the Rubber-nosed Reindeer" (Rudolph the Red-Nosed Reindeer) and "Feliz Rubberdad" (Feliz Navidad), etc.

== Reception ==
AllMusic states that in spite of the unusual instrumentation, the tracks are "still recognizable as—and a whole lot sillier than—the original carols." The reviewer concludes that while the 14 tracks "may be too much of a good thing", the release constitutes "easily the most novel holiday novelty album in a long while. It must be heard to be believed." Scott Frampton of CMJ New Music Monthly wrote that the album would have strong appeal to "aficionados of the pop-culturally weird".

Kyle Brown of Rubber and Plastic News wrote that "The snaps and twangs aren't always pitch-perfect, but a lot of spirit comes through. Even the off notes sometimes sound catchy in new and interesting ways." Canadian broadcaster and columnist MC Gilles included the album at number three in a list of his five top Christmas novelty albums, describing it as "unbearable, but nice." Brian Boyd of the Irish Times included the album at number four on a list of "5 weirdest albums of all time", describing it as "a unique listening experience ... Criminally out of print, it can only be listened to in [short] intervals" but "you sort of want it in your collection all the same."

Tracks from the album have been featured on both the BBC and on the ABC's Radio National websites, the latter in a "Christmas surprise cracker."

== Track listing ==
No.	Title	Length
1.	"Rubber Bells" (Jingle Bells)	1:37
2.	"Rudolph the Rubber-Nosed Reindeer" (Rudolph the Red-Nosed Reindeer)	1:13
3.	"Ring Rubber Bells" (Carol of the Bells)	1:09
4.	"Little Rubber Boy" (The Little Drummer Boy)	1:58
5.	"Deck the Halls with Rubber" (Deck the Halls)	0:50
6.	"Feliz Rubberdad" (Feliz Navidad)	1:58
7.	"Rübber" (Noël)	2:22
8.	"Oh Rubber Tree" (Oh Christmas Tree)	1:07
9.	"God Rest Ye Merry Rubbermen" (God Rest Ye Merry Gentlemen)	2:44
10.	"Rubber Ride" (Sleigh Ride)	1:40
11.	"Rubber Clause Is Coming To Town" (Santa Claus is Comin' to Town)	1:36
12.	"Rubber To The World" (Joy To The World)	0:52
13.	"Rubber Bell Rock" (Jingle Bell Rock)	1:47
14.	"Rubber Night (Ode to Jimi)" (Silent Night)	2:34
Total length:		23:27

Source for track listing: AllMusic.
