= Snoopy's Christmas =

- Side A of the Australian single

Single by The Royal Guardsmen

from the album Snoopy and His Friends
- B-side: "It Kinda Looks Like Christmas"
- Released: 1967
- Genre: Rock; novelty; Christmas
- Length: 3:10 (single version); 6:16 (album version)
- Label: Laurie (LR 3416)
- Songwriters: George David Weiss; Hugo & Luigi

The Royal Guardsmen singles chronology
"Wednesday" (1967)	"Snoopy's Christmas" (1967)	"I Say Love" (1968)

"Snoopy's Christmas" is a song by The Royal Guardsmen which appears on the album Snoopy and His Friends (1967).

== Overview ==
A followup to their earlier hit "Snoopy vs. the Red Baron", the song is a fictional account of how Snoopy was directed to go out and fight the Red Baron on a bitterly cold Christmas Eve. The Baron has Snoopy at his mercy after a long dogfight, but instead of shooting him down he forces Snoopy to land and offers Snoopy a chivalrous holiday toast. Afterward, Snoopy and the Red Baron fly their separate ways, "each knowing they'd meet on some other day".

The release begins with a chorus singing "O Tannenbaum" ("O Christmas Tree"). The middle of the song is bridged by chimes ringing out a phrase from "Hark the Herald Angels Sing". The chimes can also be heard during the fade-out at the end of the song. The album version of the song has a simulated radio news report of failed efforts at a Christmas truce, leading to Snoopy being sent out to hunt his sworn foe.

The song references the 1914 "Christmas truce" of World War I which was initiated not by German and British commanders, but by the soldiers themselves. The length of the cease-fire varied by location, and was reported to have been as brief as Christmas Day or as long as the week between Christmas and New Year's Day. Trench-bound combatants exchanged small gifts across the lines, with Germans giving beer to the British, who sent tobacco and tinned meat back in return. No Man's Land was cleared of dead bodies, trenches were repaired and drained, and troops from both sides shared pictures of their families and, in some places, used No Man's Land for friendly games of football. The song even has the initiator correct as it was generally the German soldiers who called over to the British and initiated the truce and, in the song, it is the Red Baron—a German WWI hero—who extends the hand of Christmas friendship to Snoopy.

This song is sometimes mistaken for a Monkees song, because Barry Winslow's vocals on the song were too similar to Micky Dolenz.

== Reception ==
A float featuring two planes flown by Snoopy and the Red Baron features at the Santa Parade in Dunedin, New Zealand every year.

"Snoopy's Christmas" reached the No. 1 position in the New Zealand and Australia singles charts in 1967, and remains a popular Christmas song in those countries. The song was the fastest-selling single at the time it was originally released and is estimated to be the biggest selling overseas single sold in New Zealand in the 20th century. The song frequently reenters the New Zealand singles chart, charting in December 1987, 1988, 1989, and 2013. "Snoopy's Christmas" was also voted "the worst Christmas song of all time" by readers of the New Zealand Herald in 2007. Bruce Ward, the EMI executive who was in his first year at EMI when he chose to release the song as a single, puts its success down to "New Zealand's strange taste in music".

In Canada, the song reached No. 39, January 6, 1968.

== Certifications ==
Region	Certification	Certified units/sales
New Zealand (RMNZ)	Platinum	30,000^{‡}
^{‡} Sales+streaming figures based on certification alone.

== See also ==
- List of anti-war songs

== External sources ==
- Bruce Ward explains the local success of 'Snoopy's Christmas', Charlotte Ryan interviews the EMI executive responsible for releasing Snoopy and the Red Baron and Snoopy's Christmas in New Zealand, 21 December 2019, Radio New Zealand
