= Snoopy for President =

Studio album by The Royal Guardsmen
- Released: 1968
- Label: Laurie

Snoopy for President is the fourth studio album by American rock band the Royal Guardsmen, released by Laurie Records in 1968.

== Overview ==
A follow-up to Snoopy's Christmas, the song is set in the same year of its release, 1968. Snoopy is tasked by The Great Pumpkin to run for President of the United States, believing that "love has left the people across our native land". Snoopy proceeds to campaign for the presidency and comes up short of winning by a singular vote. Snoopy wins when a stranger raises their hand to cast one last vote for Snoopy, which puts him over the amount needed to clinch the electoral victory, making him President of the United States. The "stranger" turns out to be none other than Snoopy's longtime arch-nemesis the Red Baron, who again refers to Snoopy as his friend, referencing their encounter in the previous year's song which depicted their participation in the Christmas Truce of 1914.
