= Snoopy vs. the Red Baron (song) =

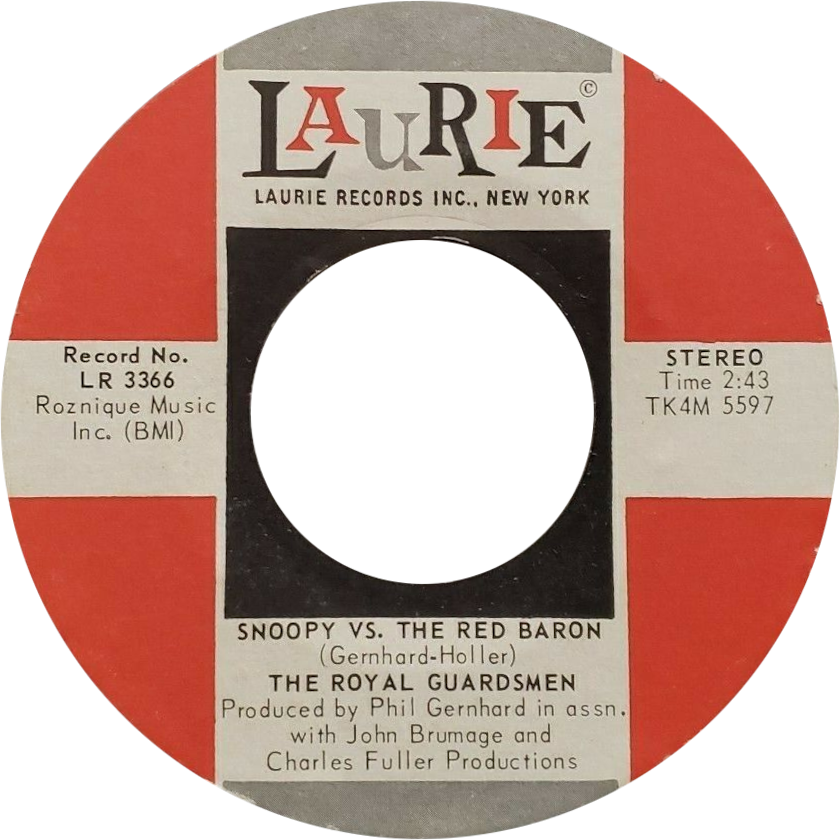
- One of side-A labels of the US single

Single by The Royal Guardsmen

from the album Snoopy vs. the Red Baron
- B-side: "I Needed You" (non-LP track)
- Released: November 1966
- Recorded: Charles Fuller Productions studio, Tampa, Florida
- Genre: Rock, novelty
- Length: 2:40
- Label: Laurie
- Songwriters: Phil Gernhard and Dick Holler
- Producers: Phil Gernhard and John Brumage

The Royal Guardsmen singles chronology
"Baby Let's Wait" (1966)	"Snoopy vs. the Red Baron" (1966)	"The Return of the Red Baron" (1967)

"Snoopy vs. the Red Baron" is a novelty song written by Phil Gernhard and Dick Holler and recorded in 1966 by the Florida-based pop group the Royal Guardsmen. The song was recorded at the Charles Fuller Productions studio in Tampa, Florida, and was released as a single on Laurie Records. Debuting at number 122 on the Bubbling Under the Hot 100 on December 10, 1966, the single moved to number 30 on December 17, 1966, entered the Top 10 at number seven on December 24, 1966, and peaked at number two on the Hot 100 during the week of December 31, 1966 (behind the Monkees' "I'm a Believer"); made number six on the Record Retailer (UK) chart in February 1967; was number one in Australia for five weeks from February 1967; and number one for three weeks in Canada. On the Hot 100, "Believer" at number one kept "Snoopy" at number two from reaching the Hot 100 summit from December 31, 1966, through January 21, 1967, after which "Snoopy" fell off. It also spent one week at the top of the Record World charts. The song sold close to three million copies. The band appeared on UK's Top of the Pops on 9 February 1967 via video.

The Royal Guardsmen went on to record several other Snoopy-themed songs, including two follow-ups to "Snoopy vs. the Red Baron" – "The Return of the Red Baron" and "Snoopy's Christmas" – together with other tunes such as "Snoopy for President". In 2006, they released "Snoopy vs Osama".

Many fans mistook this song as well as Snoopy's Christmas'' as a Monkees song because the Barry Winslow's vocals were too similar to Monkee Micky Dolenz.

== Background ==
In 1962, the song began simply as "The Red Baron"; songwriter Dick Holler patterned it after the history-minded hits of Johnny Horton (such as "Sink the Bismark" and "The Battle of New Orleans"), and told of the real-life air battles against the Red Baron. As Holler said later, "We went down to Cosimo’s in New Orleans and recorded it, and spent all day putting in airplane sounds and machine gun bullets and took it around to every major label. Nobody wanted to put it out, so it sat on the shelf for three years." Four years later, producer Phil Gernhard saw that the comic strip Peanuts, by Charles Schulz, was featuring a recurring storyline of Snoopy imagining himself in the role of a World War I airman (and his doghouse a Sopwith Camel fighter plane), fighting the Red Baron. Gernhard wrote two new verses to the song, adding the character of Snoopy, and gave it to the Royal Guardsmen to sing.

The record was released about a year after the first comic strip featuring Snoopy fighting the Red Baron appeared on Sunday October 10, 1965. Schulz and United Features Syndicate sued the Royal Guardsmen for using the name Snoopy without permission or an advertising license. (The Guardsmen, meanwhile, hedged their bets by recording an alternative version of the song, called "Squeaky vs. the Black Knight"; some copies of this version were issued by Laurie Records in Canada.) UFS won the suit, on the condition that all publishing revenues from the song would go to them. Schulz did allow the group to write more Snoopy songs.

The song begins with a background commentary in faux German: "Achtung! Jetzt wir singen zusammen die Geschichte über den Schweinköpfigen Hund und den lieben Red Baron", which is a purposeful mistranslation of the English: "Attention! We will now sing together the story of that pig-headed dog (Snoopy) and the beloved Red Baron" and features the sound of a German sergeant counting off in ones ("eins, zwei, drei, vier", after the first verse), and an American sergeant counting off in fours (after the second verse); a fighter plane; machine guns; and a plane in a tailspin (at the end of the last verse). From 1:46 to 1:54, the song quotes a variant of the instrumental chords from the McCoys' version of "Hang on Sloopy". On the original recording of "Snoopy", the lyrics "Hang on Snoopy, Snoopy hang on" were sung at this point. This tactic led to some initial speculation that the Guardsmen were the McCoys under a different name. Prior to its release, these lyrics were removed to prevent copyright issues.

The song's chorus refers to "the bloody Red Baron". As "bloody" is considered a mild expletive in Australia and some other English-speaking countries, the word was censored by being "bleeped" out for radio and TV airplay in Australia during the 1960s and early 1970s.

== Other releases and covers ==
A rare promotional record (only 1,000 were pressed, labelled "Omnimedia") for the advertising arm of Charles Fuller Productions included the removed lyrics "Hang on Snoopy". It is a two-sided 7" that plays at 33 1/3 RPM.

The song was featured as a cover version on a children's album of the same name in the early 1970s by the Peter Pan Pop Band and Singers.

In 1976, the Irish Rovers covered this song on their children's studio album The Children of the Unicorn on the K-Tel International label. It was the 12th album by this Canadian/Irish folk music group.

In 1973, a group named the Hotshots reached number four in the UK Singles Chart with their cover version of the song, performed in a ska style.

In 1967, Italian singer Giorgio Gaber recorded an Italian version of this song, "Snoopy contro il Barone Rosso". He also recorded a Spanish version, "Snoopy contra el Barón Rojo", with lyrics very similar to his Italian version.

Also in 1967, Spanish band Los Mustang recorded a different version in Spanish, also titled "Snoopy contra el Barón Rojo", with different lyrics from Gaber's version.

Also in 1967, Brazilian singer Ronnie Von recorded a version, "Soneca Contra o Barão Vermelho", Snoopy then being known in Brazil as either Xereta ("snoopy" in Portuguese) or Soneca ("snooze") in local editions of the Schulz comic strip.

In 1977, Finnish band Kontra recorded a version in Finnish titled "Ressu ja Punainen Parooni". It was released as the B-side of their debut single, "Aja hiljaa isi" (Love Records LRS 2185).

In 2003, a band named the Staggers released a hard-rock cover of the song.

The song inspired the title of Kim Newman's novel The Bloody Red Baron (1995). The book features both the Red Baron and Snoopy, though the latter is deliberately unnamed to avoid copyright issues.

In 2015, Dick Holler, one of the authors of the original lyrics of the song released in 1966, recorded a version of the song along with several members of his family during a family reunion in Berkeley, California.

The song is briefly heard toward the end of Quentin Tarantino's 2019 film Once Upon a Time in Hollywood.
