= The Royal Guardsmen =

American rock band

- Origin: Ocala, Florida, United States
- Genres: Rock, pop rock
- Years active: 1966–1971, 1976–1979, 2004–2006, 2010–2011, 2018
- Label: Laurie

The Royal Guardsmen are an American rock band best known for their 1966 hit singles "Snoopy vs. the Red Baron", "The Return of the Red Baron", "Snoopy for President", and the Christmas follow-up "Snoopy's Christmas".

== History ==
Originally known as the Posmen, the Ocala, Florida-based sextet adopted their anglophile moniker during the British Invasion, led by the Beatles and other British artists. The group was originally composed of Bill Balogh (bass), John Burdett (drums), Chris Nunley (vocals), Tom Richards (guitar), Billy Taylor (organ), and Barry Winslow (lead vocals/guitar). The band was managed by Leonard Stogel.

The Royal Guardsmen's first single, "Baby Let's Wait", did not chart nationally. The group's second offering, "Snoopy vs. the Red Baron", reached number two in the Billboard Hot 100 and spent one week at number one in the Record World chart, remained in the bestsellers for 12 weeks, and was certified gold by the RIAA in February 1967. The song also spent seven weeks at Number One on the Australian chart.

Since the band did not ask Peanuts creator Charles M. Schulz for permission, the Canadian arm of Laurie Records refused to issue the single until the legal problems were ironed out: instead, the band recorded the thinly disguised "Squeaky vs. the Black Knight", which was released in Canada and became a hit on at least one Canadian station. Eventually, Schulz gave his okay, and "Snoopy vs. the Red Baron" was released in Canada.

Immediately the song became a hit and Snoopy, the Red Baron, and aircraft became recurring themes in their music, though they did have the top 100 singles "Any Wednesday", "I Say Love", and (at number 35) "Baby Let's Wait", a re-release of their first single. Still, some members felt typecast as the Snoopy band and the original group split up in 1970, although a band with some replacement players continued for another year.

In 1976, the original members (except for organist Taylor) got back together and played club dates for another three years before disbanding again. Guitarist Richards died later that year at age 30 of a brain tumor. The band (including Taylor, with local guitarist Pat Waddell substituting for Richards) next reunited for a live show on October 2, 2004, at the 50th reunion of their high school marching band, after which the band played a few other shows in 2005. They performed together in 2010; their next live performance after that was 2018.

In December 2006, they released a new Snoopy song, "Snoopy vs. Osama", and in 2011, the single "Alive and Well".

In the Crossfire Band of Ocala, original members Chris Nunley and Bill Balough and replacement member Pat Waddell continued playing together at least into 2021.

== Discography ==
=== Albums ===
- Snoopy vs. the Red Baron (1966) number 44
- Return of the Red Baron (1967)
- Snoopy and His Friends (1967) number 46
  - Also on Billboard's Christmas Album chart at number 6 in 1967 and number 19 in 1968
- Snoopy for President (1968, re-released 1976) number 189 in 1968, in 1976
- Merry Snoopy's Christmas (1978, 1980, 1982, 1984)
- Anthology (CD, April 1995)
- Best of the Royal Guardsmen (CD, May 1998)
- Snoopy vs. the Red Baron / Snoopy and His Friends (CD re-release, June 2001)
- Return of the Red Baron / Snoopy for President (CD re-release, June 2001)

=== Singles ===
Year	Single (A-side, B-side) Both sides from same album except where indicated	Chart Positions					Album
Year	Single (A-side, B-side) Both sides from same album except where indicated	US	UK	AUS	NZ	CAN	Album
1966	"Baby Let's Wait" b/w "Leaving Me" (from Return of the Red Baron)	—	—	—	—	—	Snoopy vs. the Red Baron
1966	"Snoopy vs. the Red Baron" b/w "I Needed You" (Non-album track)	2	8	1	8	1	Snoopy vs. the Red Baron
1967	"The Return of the Red Baron" b/w "Sweetmeats Slide" (from Snoopy vs. the Red Baron)	15	37	7	—	30	The Return of the Red Baron
1967	"Airplane Song (My Airplane)" b/w "Om"	46	—	11	2	45	The Return of the Red Baron
1967	"Any Wednesday" b/w "So Right (To Be in Love)" (from Snoopy and His Friends)	97	—	—	—	100	The Return of the Red Baron
1967	"Snoopy's Christmas" b/w "It Kinda Looks Like Christmas"	—^{[A]}	—	1	1	39	Snoopy and His Friends
1968	"I Say Love" b/w "It Kinda Looks Like Christmas"	72	—	—	—	—	Snoopy and His Friends
1968	"Snoopy for President"^{[B]} b/w "Down Behind The Lines" (from Snoopy and His Friends)	85	—	68	—	—	Snoopy for President
1968	"Baby Let's Wait" (reissue) b/w "Biplane Evermore"^{[C]} (from Snoopy For President)	35	—	62	—	19	Snoopy vs. the Red Baron
1969	"Magic Window" b/w "Mother, Where's Your Daughter"	112	—	—	—	—	Non-album tracks
1969	"The Smallest Astronaut"^{[D]} b/w "Quality Woman"^{[D]}	—	—	60	—	—	Non-album tracks
1972	"Snoopy for President" (reissue) b/w "Down Behind The Lines" (from Snoopy and His Friends)	—	—	—	—	—	Snoopy for President
1976	"Snoopy for President" (reissue) b/w "Sweetmeats Slide" (from Snoopy vs. The Red Baron)	—	—	—	—	—	Snoopy for President
1978	"Snoopy's Christmas" (reissue) b/w "The Smallest Astronaut"^{[D]} (Non-album track)	—	—	—	—	—	Merry Snoopy's Christmas
2006	"Snoopy vs. Osama"	—	—	—	—	—	Non-album track
"–" denotes releases that did not chart.

- A Charted 3 times in the US – 1967, 1968, and 1969 reaching number one, number 15, and number 11 respectively but only on Billboard's "Best Bets For Christmas" chart.
- B Original version contains intro mentioning real 1968 candidates; 1972 and 1976 re-issues omit this.
- C Only the 'B' side "Biplane Evermore" charted in Australia. Some versions released elsewhere contain "So Right (To Be in Love)" as the 'B' side.
- D Barry Winslow solo, but features on some of the Royal Guardsmen's compilation albums.
