= Trans-Siberian Orchestra discography =

- Studio albums: 6
- Extended plays: 2
- Soundtrack albums: 1
- Compilation albums: 1
- Singles: 8
- Video albums: 1

Trans-Siberian Orchestra have released six studio albums, one soundtrack album, one compilation album, two EPs, one video album and eight singles.

== Albums ==
=== Studio albums ===
List of albums, with selected chart positions
Title	Album details	Peak chart positions										Sales	Certifications
Title	Album details	US	US Inter.	US Hol.	US Hard Rock	US Digi.	US Rock	CAN	US Heat.	US Con. Christ.	US Pop	Sales	Certifications
Christmas Eve and Other Stories	Released: October 15, 1996; Label: Atlantic (92736); Format: CD, cassette	48	—	3	—	14	—	—	3	2	1	US: 3,430,000	RIAA: 3× Platinum
The Christmas Attic	Released: September 15, 1998; Label: Atlantic (83145); Format: CD, CS	60	—	7	—	—	—	—	—	—	4	US: 1,900,000	RIAA: 2× Platinum
Beethoven's Last Night	Released: April 11, 2000; Label: Atlantic (83319); Format: CD, CS, vinyl	81	5	—	—	18	—	—	—	—	8		RIAA: Gold
The Lost Christmas Eve	Released: October 12, 2004; Label: Lava Records (93146); Format: CD	26	—	2	—	12	—	—	—	—	1	US: 2,380,000	RIAA: 2× Platinum
Night Castle	Released: October 28, 2009; Label: Lava; Format: CD, vinyl	5	—	—	1	1	2	24	—	—	—		RIAA: Platinum
Letters from the Labyrinth	Released: November 13, 2015; Label: Republic; Format: CD, digital	7	—	—	1	5	1	15	—	—	—	US: 300,000	
"—" denotes a recording that did not chart or was not released in that territory.

=== Soundtrack albums ===
List of soundtrack albums, with selected chart positions
Title	Album details	Peak chart positions		Sales
Title	Album details	US	CAN	Sales
The Ghosts of Christmas Eve	Released: October 21, 2016; Label: Lava Music; Format: CD, digital, vinyl	9	86	US: 27,000

=== Compilation albums ===
List of compilation albums, with selected details
Title	Album details
Tales of Winter: Selections from the TSO Rock Operas	Released: October 4, 2013; Label: Lava (73994); Format: CD

=== Video albums ===
List of video albums, with selected details
Title	Album details
The Ghosts of Christmas Eve	Released: November 13, 2001; Format: DVD, CD

== Extended plays ==
List of extended plays, with selected chart positions
Title	Details	Peak chart positions					Sales
Title	Details	US	Holiday	Digital	Rock	Hard Rock	Sales
Trans-Siberian Orchestra (Wal-Mart Exclusive)	Released: 2007; Label: Atlantic Records; Format: CD	90	12	—	—	—	
Dreams of Fireflies (On a Christmas Night)	Released: October 30, 2012; Label: Atlantic/Lava (35321); Format: CD	9	2	4	3	1	US: 344,000
"—" denotes a recording that did not chart.

== Singles ==
List of singles, with selected chart positions
Title	Year	Peak chart positions							Certifications
Title	Year	US Main Rock	US Adult 40	US Adult 40 Recur.	US Digital	US AC	US Holiday	US Christ Digital	Certifications
"Christmas Eve/Sarajevo 12/24"	1996	29	25	8	21	—	15	1	RIAA: 3× Platinum
"Christmas Canon"	2005	—	—	—	39	—	9	—	RIAA: 2× Platinum
"Wizards in Winter"	2005	—	—	—	72	18	—	—	RIAA: Platinum
"Carol of the Bells"	2010	—	—	—	—	—	—	—	
"Nutrocker"	2010	—	—	—	—	14	—	—	
"Fireflies"	2012	—	—	—	—	3	—	—	
"Forget About the Blame" (featuring Lzzy Hale)	2015	30	—	—	—	—	—	—	
"Music Box Blues"	2015	—	—	—	—	26	—	—	
"—" denotes a recording that did not chart or was not released in that territory.

=== Other certified songs ===
Title	Year	Certifications
"A Mad Russian's Christmas"	1996	RIAA: Gold
