= Al Pitrelli =

American guitarist

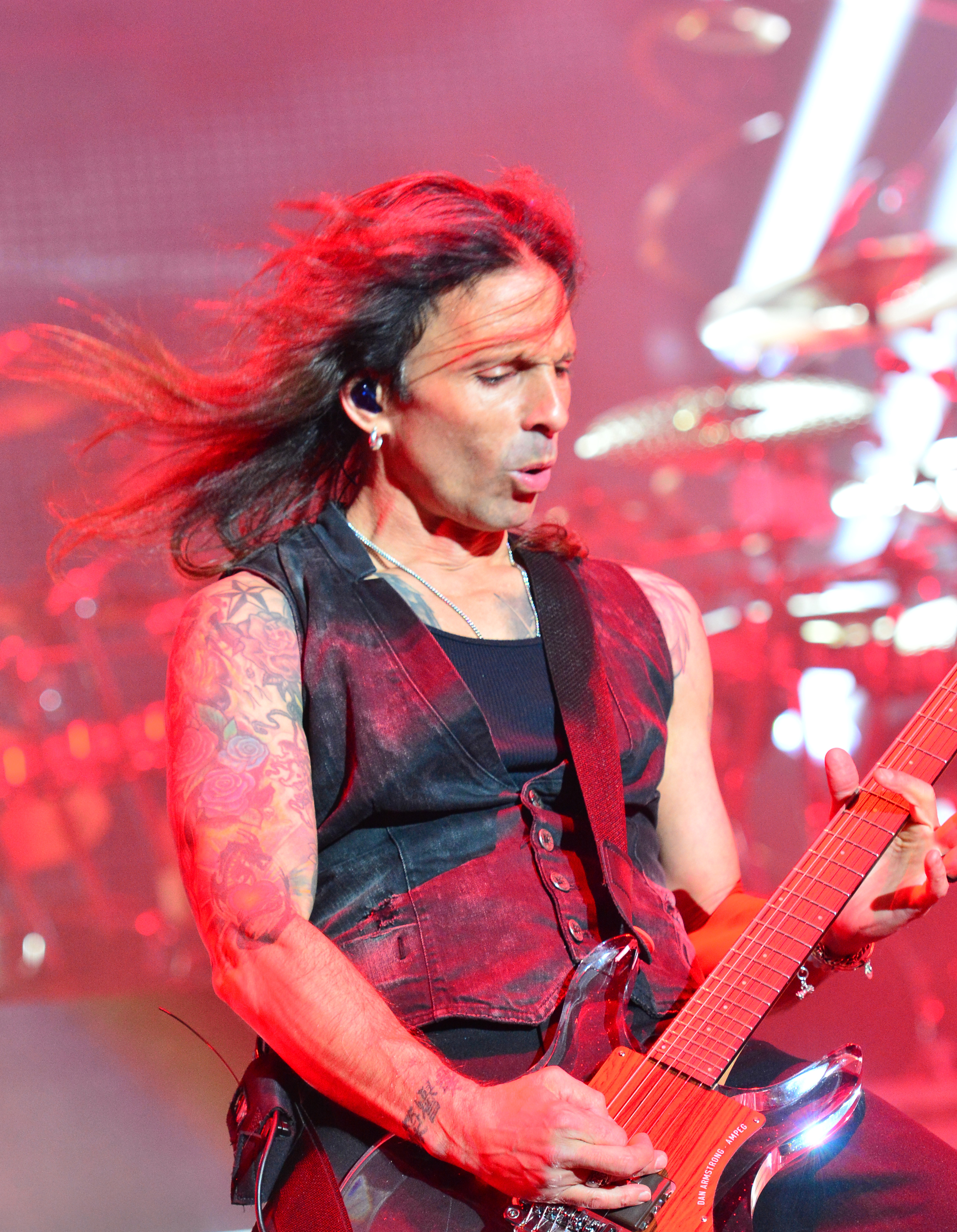
- Pitrelli with Savatage at Wacken Open Air 2015

Background information
- Born: September 26, 1962 (age 63); Hicksville, Long Island, New York
- Genres: Hard rock, heavy metal, thrash metal, progressive metal, symphonic metal
- Occupation: Guitarist
- Years active: 1982–present
- Member of: Savatage, Trans-Siberian Orchestra
- Formerly of: Danger Danger, Megadeth, Hotshot, Alice Cooper, Asia, Place Called Rage, O'2L, Widowmaker, Michael Bolton, Vertex

Al Pitrelli (born September 26, 1962) is an American guitarist, best known for his work with the Trans-Siberian Orchestra, Megadeth, Alice Cooper and Savatage. He has performed with various acts as a band member, session musician and touring member, including Michael Bolton, Celine Dion, Asia, Dee Snider, Kathy Troccoli, Taylor Dayne, Blue Öyster Cult, Exposé and Joe Lynn Turner.

== Career ==
=== Early career (1982–1999) ===
Pitrelli attended the Berklee College of Music in Boston in the early 1980s, where future Alice Cooper bandmate and keyboardist Derek Sherinian was his dorm roommate. While at Berklee, Pitrelli formed an original 1980s metal band with classmates that included future Venom guitarist Mike Hickey. After dropping out of Berklee, Pitrelli worked as a session musician and taught guitar lessons in Manhattan and in Bellmore, New York. His first major label gig was performing with Michael Bolton, helping him support his single "Fool's Game". Pitrelli said of the single, "This was when Michael Bolton was still trying to be Sammy Hagar and not Engelbert Humperdinck."

In 1989, Pitrelli featured as second guitar on the song "Uptown" on bassist Randy Coven's first album "Funk Me Tender". He then joined Coven and drummer John O'Reilly as a formal member of the Randy Coven Band to release Sammy Says Ouch! This lineup would also release an album titled CPR under the band name Coven, Pitrelli, Reilly. Pitrelli was Alice Cooper's guitarist and musical director from 1989 to 1991, having been recommended to the band by Steve Vai, and appeared on the Trashes The World video album, in addition to co-writing the song "Burning Our Bed" from the Hey Stoopid (1991) album. He later joined Dee Snider's band Widowmaker for two albums in the early/mid–1990s, and also briefly played with Stephen Pearcy of Ratt in a band called Vertex. Pitrelli also joined Asia, appearing on their albums Aqua (1992) and Aria (1994). He would go on to be featured on many New York sessions, including for Celine Dion, Kathy Troccoli, Taylor Dayne and Exposé. From February to March 1999, Pitrelli toured with Blue Öyster Cult as a substitute for Allen Lanier.

=== Savatage (1995–2000, 2002, 2015, 2023-present) ===
Pitrelli joined Savatage in 1995, around the same time as guitarist Chris Caffery returned to the band, who had previously been part of the band around the release of Gutter Ballet in 1989. Pitrelli played guitar on the albums Dead Winter Dead (1995) and The Wake of Magellan (1997), and performed some lead guitar work on Poets and Madmen (2001), despite being a member of Megadeth at the time. On the latter album, Pitrelli was played the outro of "Stay with Me a While", the main solos of "Morphine Child" and "The Rumor", the first part of the main solo in "Commissar" and its outro. He left Savatage in 2000 join Megadeth and rejoined the band following Megadeth's disbandment in 2002. Savatage split up later that year, but reunited for an appearance at Wacken Open Air in 2015 and the recording of a new album in 2023. In 2025 he went on a new world tour with Savatage, which is supposed to be followed by a new album.

=== Trans-Siberian Orchestra (1995–present) ===
In 1995, Pitrelli was asked by Savatage's producer Paul O'Neill to join his new project, the Trans-Siberian Orchestra. Pitrelli has been a core member of the band since their debut album, Christmas Eve and Other Stories, was released in 1996. In addition to being the band's main lead guitarist, he is also the live musical director. TSO's 2007 tour program describes Pitrelli's "edgy playing and vast musical lexicon" as key components for contributing to the band's constant boundary-pushing progressive rock stylings. Pitrelli's leads are notable on "Tracers" and the instrumental "Toccata – Carpimus Noctem", the latter being a piece he co-wrote. Both songs form part of the group's fifth rock opera, on their 2009 album Night Castle. Following founder O'Neill's death in 2017, Pitrelli has continued performing with the band while O'Neill's role has been taken over by his family.

=== Megadeth (2000–2002) ===
Pitrelli was a member of Megadeth from 2000 to 2002, replacing guitarist Marty Friedman. He joined the band in the middle of their Risk tour and played his first show with Megadeth on 11 January 2000, two days after Friedman's final show. Pitrelli performed on their 2001 album The World Needs a Hero, co-writing the song "Promises" and playing most of the album's guitar solos. He later appeared in an episode of VH1's Behind the Music focusing on Megadeth. Pitrelli also performed with the band for the recording of the Rude Awakening live album that was released in 2002. Following Megadeth's disbandment in April 2002 due to an arm injury sustained by frontman Dave Mustaine, Pitrelli rejoined Savatage and continued his work with Trans-Siberian Orchestra.

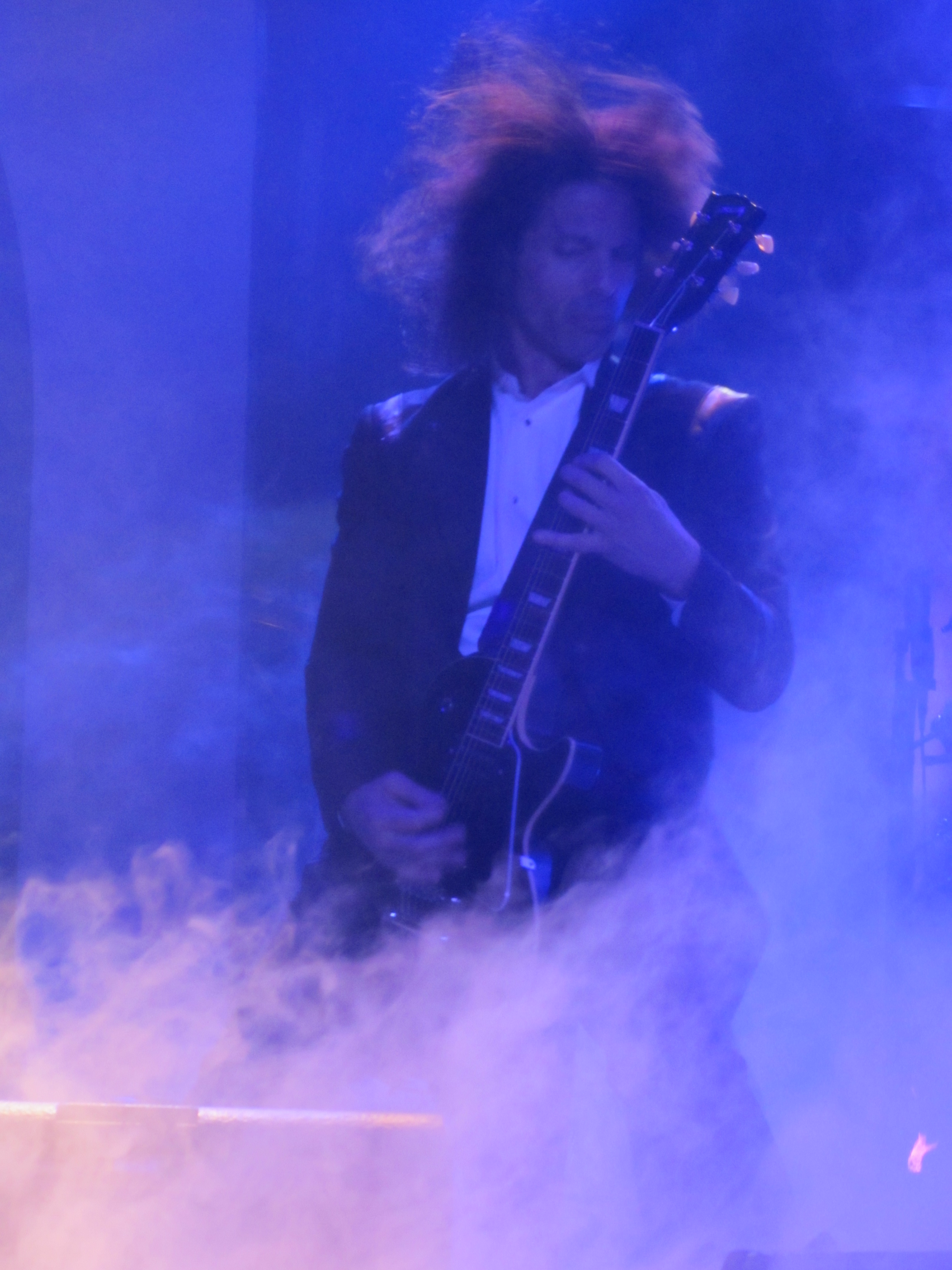
Pitrelli performing live with the Trans-Siberian Orchestra in 2012

== Selected discography ==
=== Trans-Siberian Orchestra ===
- Christmas Eve and Other Stories (1996)
- The Christmas Attic (1998)
- The Ghosts of Christmas Eve (2000)
- Beethoven's Last Night (2000)
- The Lost Christmas Eve (2004)
- Night Castle (2009)
- Dreams of Fireflies (2012)
- Tales of Winter: Selections from the TSO Rock Operas (2013)
- Letters from the Labyrinth (2015)

=== Megadeth ===
- Capitol Punishment: The Megadeth Years (2000)
- The World Needs a Hero (2001)
- Rude Awakening (2002)
- Still Alive... and Well? (2002)
- Greatest Hits: Back to the Start (2005)
- Anthology: Set the World Afire (2008)
- Warheads on Foreheads (2019)

=== Alice Cooper ===
- Alice Cooper Trashes The World (1990)
- Classicks (1995)

=== Savatage ===
- Dead Winter Dead (1995)
- The Wake of Magellan (1998)
- Poets and Madmen (2001)

=== Danger Danger ===
- Rare Cuts (2003)

=== Hotshot ===
- The Bomb (2005)

=== Asia ===
- Aqua (1992)
- Aria (1994)

=== Place Called Rage ===
- Place Called Rage (1995)

=== Randy Coven ===
- Funk Me Tender (1989)
- Sammy Says Ouch! (1990)

=== Coven, Pitrelli, O'Reilly ===
- CPR (1992)

=== Morning Wood ===
- Morning Wood (1994)

=== O'2L ===
- O'2L
- Doyle's Brunch
- Eat a Pickle

=== Widowmaker ===
- Blood and Bullets (1992)
- Stand By for Pain (1994)

=== Vertex ===
- Vertex (1996)

=== Guitar Battle ===
- Guitar Battle (1998)

Preceded by	Danger Danger guitarist 1987–1988	Succeeded by Tony "Bruno" Rey
Preceded by Marty Friedman	Megadeth lead guitarist 2000–2002	Succeeded by Chris Poland
