= List of best-selling Christmas albums in the United States =

This page shows the best-selling Christmas albums in the United States. It includes artists from all over the world, but it only includes sales in the United States of America.

Prior to March 1, 1991, the only means of tracking sales figures for record albums and singles in the United States was via the certification system of the Recording Industry Association of America (RIAA), based specifically on shipments (less potential returns) on a long-term basis. According to the most recent record album certifications, the holiday album title that has shipped the most copies in the United States is Elvis Presley's 1957 LP Elvis' Christmas Album, which is certified by the RIAA for shipment of 17 million copies in the U.S. (3 million copies of the original 1957 release on RCA Victor Records, plus 10 million copies of a "budget" edition first released by RCA Camden in 1970 and then by Pickwick Records in 1975, and 4 million copies of another RCA reissue titled It's Christmas Time released in 1985).

From March 1, 1991, through the present day, the Nielsen SoundScan tracking system has been more widely used to accurately track sales of record albums and singles at the point of sale (POS) based on inventory bar code scans.

== Best-selling Christmas albums (using RIAA certifications and Nielsen SoundScan sales through December 2023) ==
In November 2016, Billboard has compiled a list of the top ten selling Christmas albums, using both RIAA certification information and actual point-of-sale data from Nielsen SoundScan. For albums released before SoundScan started collecting data in 1991, Billboard used their RIAA certification to determine sales. As of March 14, 2026, Mariah Carey's Merry Christmas certified album sales of 10 million in the United States.

1. Elvis's Christmas Album (1970 version) / Elvis Presley ~ 10,000,000
2. Merry Christmas / Mariah Carey ~ 10,000,000
3. Miracles: The Holiday Album / Kenny G ~ 7,370,000
4. The Christmas Song / Nat King Cole ~ 6,000,000
5. Mannheim Steamroller Christmas / Mannheim Steamroller ~ 6,000,000
6. A Fresh Aire Christmas / Mannheim Steamroller ~ 6,000,000
7. Noël / Josh Groban ~ 5,890,000
8. These Are Special Times / Celine Dion ~ 5,440,000
9. A Christmas Album / Barbra Streisand ~ 5,370,000
10. Merry Christmas / Johnny Mathis ~ 5,240,000

== Best-selling Christmas albums from Nielsen SoundScan tracking data (through December 1, 2014) ==
This is a list of the 25 best-selling Christmas albums of the Nielsen SoundScan era in the United States for cumulative sales as tracked by Nielsen SoundScan through December 1, 2014. Nielsen Music began tracking sales data for Billboard on March 1, 1991.

1. Miracles: The Holiday Album / Kenny G ~7,310,000
2. Noël / Josh Groban ~ 5,710,000
3. Merry Christmas / Mariah Carey ~ 5,500,000
4. These Are Special Times / Celine Dion ~ 5,310,000
5. Christmas in the Aire / Mannheim Steamroller ~ 3,740,000
6. A Fresh Aire Christmas / Mannheim Steamroller ~ 3,660,000
7. Mannheim Steamroller Christmas / Mannheim Steamroller ~ 3,500,000
8. Now That's What I Call Christmas! / various artists ~ 3,480,000
9. Christmas Eve and Other Stories / Trans-Siberian Orchestra ~ 3,430,000
10. A Charlie Brown Christmas / Vince Guaraldi Trio ~ 3,410,000
11. Christmas / Michael Bublé ~ 3,390,000
12. When My Heart Finds Christmas / Harry Connick, Jr. ~ 3,150,000
13. My Christmas / Andrea Bocelli ~ 3,010,000
14. Christmas Extraordinaire / Mannheim Steamroller ~ 2,920,000
15. Home for Christmas / *NSYNC ~ 2,760,000
16. Faith: A Holiday Album / Kenny G ~ 2,750,000
17. Beyond the Season / Garth Brooks ~ 2,650,000
18. Home for Christmas / Amy Grant ~ 2,540,000
19. A Very Special Christmas / various artists ~ 2,520,000
20. The Lost Christmas Eve / Trans-Siberian Orchestra ~ 2,380,000
21. A Very Special Christmas 2 / various artists ~ 2,200,000
22. The Gift / Susan Boyle ~ 2,180,000
23. Christmas Portrait / The Carpenters ~ 1,950,000
24. White Christmas / Bing Crosby ~ 1,950,000
25. The Christmas Album / Neil Diamond ~ 1,910,000

== Best-selling Christmas albums by RIAA certification ==
This is an incomplete list of the best-selling Christmas albums in the United States based on shipment certification by the RIAA. This list provides a more complete representation of the best-selling Christmas albums in history, as it includes those released well before the Nielsen/SoundScan era of music sales.

Year of Release	Artist(s)	Title	Label(s)	Certification Award
1970	Elvis Presley	Elvis' Christmas Album (budget reissue of 1957 LP with altered track listing)	RCA Camden/Pickwick	Diamond
1994	Mariah Carey	Merry Christmas	Columbia	Diamond
1994	Kenny G	Miracles: The Holiday Album	Arista	8× Platinum
2011	Michael Bublé	Christmas	143/Reprise	6× Platinum
2007	Josh Groban	Noël	WEA/Reprise	6× Platinum
2001	Various	Now That's What I Call Christmas!	UTV	6× Platinum
1998	Celine Dion	These Are Special Times	Epic	6× Platinum
1988	Mannheim Steamroller	A Fresh Aire Christmas	American Gramaphone	6× Platinum
1984	Mannheim Steamroller	Mannheim Steamroller Christmas	American Gramaphone	6× Platinum
1965	Vince Guaraldi Trio	A Charlie Brown Christmas	Fantasy	6× Platinum
1963	Nat King Cole	The Christmas Song (originally released in 1960 under the title The Magic of Christmas)	Capitol	6× Platinum
1967	Barbra Streisand	A Christmas Album	Columbia	5× Platinum
1958	Johnny Mathis	Merry Christmas	Columbia	5× Platinum
1995	Bing Crosby	White Christmas (originally released in 1945 under the title Merry Christmas)	Decca	4× Platinum
1995	Mannheim Steamroller	Christmas in the Aire	American Gramaphone	4× Platinum
1992	Garth Brooks	Beyond the Season	Liberty	4× Platinum
1987	Various	A Very Special Christmas	A&M	4× Platinum
1985	Elvis Presley	It's Christmas Time (retitled reissue of 1970 budget edition of Elvis' Christmas Album)	BMG	4× Platinum
1984	Various	Christmas Through the Years	Reader's Digest Music	4× Platinum
2010	Susan Boyle	The Gift	Syco/Columbia	3× Platinum
2001	Mannheim Steamroller	Christmas Extraordinaire	American Gramaphone	3× Platinum
1999	Kenny G	Faith: A Holiday Album	Arista Records	3× Platinum
1996	Trans-Siberian Orchestra	Christmas Eve and Other Stories	Lava	3× Platinum
1993	Harry Connick, Jr.	When My Heart Finds Christmas	Sony/Columbia	3× Platinum
1992	Amy Grant	Home for Christmas	A&M	3× Platinum
1982	George Winston	December	Windham Hill	3× Platinum
1971	Elvis Presley	Elvis Sings The Wonderful World of Christmas	RCA	3× Platinum
1957	Elvis Presley	Elvis' Christmas Album (original release)	RCA Victor	3× Platinum
2011	Justin Bieber	Under the Mistletoe	Island	2× Platinum
2014	Pentatonix	That's Christmas to Me	RCA	2× Platinum
2009	Andrea Bocelli	My Christmas	Decca	2× Platinum
2004	Trans-Siberian Orchestra	The Lost Christmas Eve	Lava	2× Platinum
2003	Various	Now That's What I Call Christmas!: The Signature Collection	Capitol	2× Platinum
1998	Martina McBride	White Christmas	RCA	2× Platinum
1998	*NSYNC	Home for Christmas	RCA	2× Platinum
1998	Trans-Siberian Orchestra	The Christmas Attic	Lava	2× Platinum
1993	Boyz II Men	Christmas Interpretations	Motown	2× Platinum
1993	Vince Gill	Let There Be Peace on Earth	MCA Nashville	2× Platinum
1993	Alan Jackson	Honky Tonk Christmas	Arista	2× Platinum
1992	Neil Diamond	The Christmas Album	Columbia	2× Platinum
1992	Various	A Very Special Christmas 2	A&M	2× Platinum
1989	New Kids on the Block	Merry, Merry Christmas	Columbia	2× Platinum
1987	Reba McEntire	Merry Christmas to You	MCA Nashville	2× Platinum
1986	George Strait	Merry Christmas Strait to You!	MCA Nashville	2× Platinum
1985	Alabama	Alabama Christmas	RCA	2× Platinum
1984	Kenny Rogers & Dolly Parton	Once Upon a Christmas	RCA	2× Platinum
1981	Anne Murray	Christmas Wishes	Capitol	2× Platinum
1981	Kenny Rogers	Christmas	Liberty	2× Platinum
1979	Various	Disney's Christmas Favorites	Disneyland	2× Platinum
1975	John Denver	Rocky Mountain Christmas	RCA	2× Platinum

== Best-selling Christmas albums by year ==
In 1963, Billboard magazine began publishing a special weekly sales charts for Christmas album sales named "Christmas Albums" for three to four weeks during each holiday season. Titles that appeared on these charts were excluded from the regular Billboard 200 album sales charts. These special, year-end "Christmas Albums" charts were published from 1963 to 1973. The chart was discontinued from 1974 to 1982, when holiday titles were once again included in the regular Billboard 200 chart. "Christmas Albums" started up again in 1983 and appeared each year until 1985 (during these three years, holiday titles were eligible for inclusion on the weekly Billboard 200 chart). It was discontinued in 1986, but resumed in 1987 under the name "Christmas Albums". In 2000, the chart was renamed to "Top Holiday Albums" and has been published by Billboard each year since. Billboard's special Christmas albums sales charts have varied in size over the years, from a low of 5 chart positions to a high of 117 chart positions.

=== 1940s ===
- The best-selling Christmas album of 1945 was Merry Christmas, by Bing Crosby.
- The best-selling Christmas album of 1946 was Merry Christmas, by Bing Crosby.
- The best-selling Christmas album of 1947 was Merry Christmas, by Bing Crosby.
- The best-selling Christmas album of 1948 was Merry Christmas, by Bing Crosby.
- The best-selling Christmas album of 1949 was Merry Christmas, by Bing Crosby.

=== 1950s ===
- The best-selling Christmas album of 1950 was Merry Christmas, by Bing Crosby.
- The best-selling Christmas album of 1951 was Mario Lanza Sings Christmas Songs, by Mario Lanza.
- The best-selling Christmas album of 1952 was Christmas Hymns and Carols, by The Robert Shaw Chorale.
- The best-selling Christmas album of 1953 was Christmas with Arthur Godfrey and All the Little Godfreys, by Arthur Godfrey.
- The best-selling Christmas album of 1954 was Selections from Irving Berlin's "White Christmas", by Bing Crosby, Danny Kaye and Peggy Lee.
- The best-selling Christmas album of 1955 was Happy Holiday, by Jo Stafford.
- The best-selling Christmas album of 1956 was Merry Christmas from Lawrence Welk and His Champagne Music, by Lawrence Welk.
- The best-selling Christmas album of 1957 was Elvis' Christmas Album, by Elvis Presley.
- The best-selling Christmas album of 1958 was Christmas Sing-Along with Mitch, by Mitch Miller & the Gang.
- The best-selling Christmas album of 1959 was Christmas Sing-Along with Mitch, by Mitch Miller & the Gang.

=== 1960s ===
- The best-selling Christmas album of 1960 was Christmas Sing-Along with Mitch, by Mitch Miller & the Gang.
- The best-selling Christmas album of 1961 was Holiday Sing Along with Mitch, by Mitch Miller & the Gang.
- The best-selling Christmas album of 1962 was Merry Christmas, by Johnny Mathis.
- The best-selling Christmas album of 1963 was The Andy Williams Christmas Album, by Andy Williams.
- The best-selling Christmas album of 1964 was The Andy Williams Christmas Album, by Andy Williams.
- The best-selling Christmas album of 1965 was The Little Drummer Boy: A Christmas Festival, by the Harry Simeone Chorale.
- The best-selling Christmas album of 1966 was Merry Christmas, by Andy Williams.
- The best-selling Christmas album of 1967 was A Christmas Album, by Barbra Streisand.
- The best-selling Christmas album of 1968 was That Christmas Feeling, by Glen Campbell.
- The best-selling Christmas album of 1969 was Jim Nabors' Christmas Album, by Jim Nabors.

=== 1970s ===
- The best-selling Christmas album of 1970 was The Jackson 5 Christmas Album, by The Jackson 5.
- The best-selling Christmas album of 1971 was A Partridge Family Christmas Card, by The Partridge Family.
- The best-selling Christmas album of 1972 was The Jackson 5 Christmas Album, by The Jackson 5.
- The best-selling Christmas album of 1973 was Elvis Sings The Wonderful World of Christmas, by Elvis Presley.
- The best-selling Christmas album of 1974 was The Waltons' Christmas Album, by Earl Hamner/The Holiday Singers.
- The best-selling Christmas album of 1975 was Rocky Mountain Christmas, by John Denver.
- The best-selling Christmas album of 1976 was Christmas Jollies, by The Salsoul Orchestra.
- The best-selling Christmas album of 1977 was Christmas Jollies, by The Salsoul Orchestra.
- The best-selling Christmas album of 1978 was Christmas Portrait, by The Carpenters.
- The best-selling Christmas album of 1979 was A Christmas Together, by John Denver and The Muppets.

=== 1980s ===
- The best-selling Christmas album of 1980 was Christmas in the Stars: Star Wars Christmas Album, by Meco.
- The best-selling Christmas album of 1981 was Christmas, by Kenny Rogers.
- The best-selling Christmas album of 1982 was Christmas, by The Oak Ridge Boys.
- The best-selling Christmas album of 1983 was Christmas, by Kenny Rogers.
- The best-selling Christmas album of 1984 was Once Upon a Christmas, by Kenny Rogers & Dolly Parton.
- The best-selling Christmas album of 1985 was Alabama Christmas, by Alabama.
- The best-selling Christmas album of 1986 was Merry Christmas Strait to You!, by George Strait.
- The best-selling Christmas album of 1987 was A Very Special Christmas, by various artists.
- The best-selling Christmas album of 1988 was A Fresh Aire Christmas, by Mannheim Steamroller.
- The best-selling Christmas album of 1989 was Merry, Merry Christmas, by New Kids on the Block.

=== 1990s ===
- The best-selling Christmas album of 1990 was Because It's Christmas, by Barry Manilow.
- The best-selling Christmas album of 1991 was A Fresh Aire Christmas, by Mannheim Steamroller.
- The best-selling Christmas album of 1992 was Beyond the Season, by Garth Brooks.
- The best-selling Christmas album of 1993 was When My Heart Finds Christmas, by Harry Connick, Jr.
- The best-selling Holiday album of 1994 was Miracles: The Holiday Album, by Kenny G.
- The best-selling Holiday album of 1995 was Christmas in the Aire, by Mannheim Steamroller.
- The best-selling Holiday album of 1996 was Miracles: The Holiday Album, by Kenny G.
- The best-selling Holiday album of 1997 was Snowed In, by Hanson.
- The best-selling Holiday album of 1998 was These Are Special Times, by Celine Dion.
- The best-selling Holiday album of 1999 was Faith: A Holiday Album, by Kenny G.

=== 2000s ===
- The best-selling Holiday album of 2000 was Dream a Dream, by Charlotte Church.
- The best-selling Holiday album of 2001 was Now That's What I Call Christmas!, by various artists.
- The best-selling Holiday album of 2002 was Now That's What I Call Christmas!, by various artists.
- The best-selling Holiday album of 2003 was Harry for the Holidays, by Harry Connick, Jr.
- The best-selling Holiday album of 2004 was Merry Christmas with Love, by Clay Aiken.
- The best-selling Holiday album of 2005 was The Christmas Collection, by Il Divo.
- The best-selling Holiday album of 2006 was Wintersong, by Sarah McLachlan.
- The best-selling Holiday album of 2007 was Noël, by Josh Groban.
- The best-selling Holiday album of 2008 was Noël, by Josh Groban.
- The best-selling Holiday album of 2009 was My Christmas, by Andrea Bocelli.

=== 2010s ===
- The best-selling Holiday album of 2010 was The Gift, by Susan Boyle.
- The best-selling Holiday album of 2011 was Christmas, by Michael Bublé.
- The best-selling Holiday album of 2012 was Merry Christmas, Baby, by Rod Stewart.
- The best-selling Holiday album of 2013 was Wrapped in Red, by Kelly Clarkson.
- The best-selling Holiday album of 2014 was That's Christmas to Me, by Pentatonix.
- The best-selling Holiday album of 2015 was That's Christmas to Me, by Pentatonix.
- The best-selling Holiday album of 2016 was A Pentatonix Christmas, by Pentatonix.
- The best-selling Holiday album of 2017 was Everyday Is Christmas, by Sia.

== See also ==
- Billboard Christmas Holiday Charts
- Christmas music
- List of Christmas albums
- List of best-selling Christmas singles in the United States
- List of best-selling albums in the United States of the Nielsen SoundScan era
- List of best-selling albums by year in the United States
- List of popular Christmas singles in the United States
