= List of best-selling Christmas singles in the United States =

This list of best-selling Christmas singles in the United States includes artists from around the world, but only reflects sales in the United States. According to the Guinness Book of World Records, "White Christmas" by Bing Crosby is not only the best-selling Christmas single in the United States, but also the best-selling single of all time since the advent of recorded music, with estimated sales in excess of 50 million copies worldwide.

Prior to March 1, 1991, the only means of tracking sales figures for record albums and singles in the United States was via the certification system of the Recording Industry Association of America (RIAA), based specifically on shipments (less potential returns) on a long-term basis. From March 1, 1991, through the present day, the Nielsen SoundScan tracking system has been more widely used to accurately track sales of record albums and singles at the point of sale (POS) based on inventory bar code scans, as well as digital music download sales starting in 2003. As of November 25, 2016, the holiday single with the most digital downloads is Mariah Carey's 1994 track "All I Want for Christmas Is You", which SoundScan estimates as having sold 3,200,000 copies.

== Best-selling Christmas/holiday singles by Nielsen SoundScan data ==
This is a list of the top ten best-selling Christmas singles of the SoundScan era in the United States according to the Nielsen Company, as last updated on November 25, 2016. Nielsen SoundScan began tracking digital download sales data at the end of June 2003.

=== Best-selling Christmas singles ===
Rank	Title	Artist	Released	Label	Digital downloads
1	"All I Want for Christmas Is You"	Mariah Carey	1994	Columbia	4,000,000
2	"Do You Want to Build a Snowman?"	Kristen Bell, Agatha Lee Monn & Katie Lopez	2013	Walt Disney	1,600,000
3	"Christmas Eve/Sarajevo 12/24"	Savatage (later credited to Trans-Siberian Orchestra, which featured all Savatage members)	1996	Lava	1,300,000
4	"Mistletoe"	Justin Bieber	2011	Island	1,100,000
5	"Rockin' Around the Christmas Tree"	Brenda Lee	1958	Decca	1,000,000
6	"Where Are You Christmas?"	Faith Hill	2000	Interscope	977,000
7	"Christmas Canon"	Trans-Siberian Orchestra	1998	Lava	918,000
8	"Feliz Navidad"	José Feliciano	1970	RCA	808,000
9	"Jingle Bell Rock"	Bobby Helms	1957	Decca	780,000
10	"Last Christmas"	Wham!	1984	Columbia	751,000

== Best-selling Christmas/holiday singles by RIAA certification ==
This is an incomplete list of the best-selling Christmas/holiday singles in the United States based on certification by the RIAA. This list provides a more complete representation of the best-selling Christmas/holiday albums in history, as it includes those released well before the Nielsen/SoundScan era of music sales.

=== Digital singles ===
Year of release	Title	Artist	Label	Certification award	Certification date
1994	"All I Want for Christmas Is You"	Mariah Carey	Columbia	18× Platinum	2025-12-15
1984	"Last Christmas"	Wham!	Columbia	9× Platinum	2025-12-09
1958	"Rockin' Around the Christmas Tree"	Brenda Lee	Decca	7× Platinum	2024-12-09
2013	"Do You Want to Build a Snowman?"	Kristen Bell, Agatha Lee Monn & Katie Lopez	Walt Disney	5× Platinum	2026-01-22
2014	"Santa Tell Me"	Ariana Grande	Republic	4× Platinum	2024-01-09
1978	"Please Come Home for Christmas"	Eagles	Elektra	4× Platinum	2026-10-06
2011	"Mistletoe"	Justin Bieber	Island	3× Platinum	2021-01-11
1996	"Christmas Eve/Sarajevo 12/24"	Savatage/Trans-Siberian Orchestra	Lava	3× Platinum	2025-04-14
1963	"Christmas (Baby Please Come Home)"	Darlene Love	Legacy	3× Platinum	2023-04-07
1963	"Little Saint Nick"	The Beach Boys	Capitol	3× Platinum	2026-05-15
1963	"Sleigh Ride"	The Ronettes	Legacy	3× Platinum	2023-04-07
2017	"Snowman"	Sia	Atlantic	2× Platinum	2024-12-04
1998	"Christmas Canon"	Trans-Siberian Orchestra	Lava	2× Platinum	2025-04-14
1959	"Baby, It's Cold Outside"	Dean Martin	Capitol	2× Platinum	2024-09-06
1959	"Let It Snow! Let It Snow! Let It Snow!"	Dean Martin	Capitol	2× Platinum	2024-09-06
2019	"Like It's Christmas"	Jonas Brothers	Republic	Platinum	2023-01-25
2018	"Cozy Little Christmas"	Katy Perry	Capitol	Platinum	2022-01-27
2018	"What Christmas Means to Me"	John Legend (Featuring Stevie Wonder)	Columbia	Platinum	2022-03-22
2017	"A Ghetto Christmas Carol"	XXXTentacion	Bad Vibes Forever	Platinum	2023-05-02
2017	"You Make It Feel Like Christmas"	Gwen Stefani (Featuring Blake Shelton)	Interscope	Platinum	2023-12-04
2016	"Hallelujah"	Pentatonix	RCA	Platinum	2018-02-09
2014	"Mary, Did You Know"	Pentatonix	RCA	Platinum	2018-02-09
2007	"This Christmas"	Chris Brown	RCA	Platinum	2021-10-01
2005	"Wizards in Winter"	Trans-Siberian Orchestra	Lava	Platinum	2025-04-14
1994	"Christmas (Baby Please Come Home)"	Mariah Carey	Columbia	Platinum	2022-03-27
1994	"Hark! The Herald Angels Sing/Gloria (In Excelsis Deo)"	Mariah Carey	Columbia	Platinum	2023-12-08
1994	"O Holy Night"	Mariah Carey	Columbia	Platinum	2023-12-08
1973	"Step into Christmas"	Elton John	MCA	Platinum	2025-12-01
1965	"Christmas Time Is Here"	Vince Guaraldi Trio	Fantasy	Platinum	2019-01-31
1963	"Winter Wonderland"	Darlene Love	Legacy	Platinum	2023-04-07
1958	"Run Rudolph Run"	Chuck Berry	Geffen	Platinum	2020-11-18
2023	"Blue Christmas"	Kane Brown & Elvis Presley	RCA Nashville	Gold	2025-04-14
2023	"Winter Wonderland"	Laufey	AWAL	Gold	2026-01-16
2021	"Merry Christmas"	Ed Sheeran and Elton John	Atlantic	Gold	2024-09-27
2021	"Pick Out a Christmas Tree"	Dan + Shay	Warner Music Nashville	Gold	2024-05-09
2020	"Do You Hear What I Hear?"	For King & Country	Curb	Gold	2024-07-25
2020	"Take Me Home for Christmas"	Dan + Shay	Warner Music Nashville	Gold	2022-02-03
2019	"Do You Hear What I Hear?"	Pentatonix Featuring Whitney Houston	RCA	Gold	2023-01-27
2018	"Happy Xmas (War Is Over)"	John Legend	Columbia	Gold	2023-02-14
2017	"Candy Cane Lane"	Sia	Atlantic	Gold	2023-11-15
2017	"Santa's Coming for Us"	Sia	Atlantic	Gold	2023-11-15
2015	"Noel"	Chris Tomlin (with Lauren Daigle)	sixstepsrecords/Sparrow	Gold	2024-03-07
2014	"Have Yourself a Merry Little Christmas"	Sam Smith	Capitol	Gold	2020-02-11
2011	"All I Want for Christmas Is You (SuperFestive!)"	Justin Bieber with Mariah Carey	Island	Gold	2020-06-25
2011	"The Christmas Song (Chestnuts Roasting on an Open Fire)"	Justin Bieber featuring Usher	Def Jam	Gold	2024-01-10
2011	"Santa Claus Is Coming to Town"	Justin Bieber	Def Jam	Gold	2023-12-12
2010	"Shake Up Christmas"	Train	Columbia	Gold	2024-02-26
2002	"Mary, Did You Know?"	Kenny Rogers & Wynonna Judd	Curb	Gold	2024-07-25
2000	"The Christmas Shoes"	NewSong	Benson/Reunion	Gold	2020-07-31
2000	"My Only Wish (This Year)"	Britney Spears	Jive	Gold	2023-10-24
1996	"Chanukah Song"	Adam Sandler	Warner Bros.	Gold	2009-10-05
1996	"A Mad Russian's Christmas"	Trans-Siberian Orchestra	Lava	Gold	2025-04-14
1994	"Santa Claus Is Comin' to Town"	Mariah Carey	Columbia	Gold	2022-03-27
1982	"Hard Candy Christmas"	Dolly Parton	RCA	Gold	2022-10-21
1965	"Linus and Lucy"	Vince Guaraldi Trio	Fantasy	Gold	2019-05-10
1963	"Frosty the Snowman"	The Ronettes	Legacy	Gold	2023-04-07

=== Cellular ringtones ===
Year of release	Title	Artist	Labels	Certification award	Certification date
2006	"All I Want for Christmas Is You"	Mariah Carey	Columbia	2× Multi-Platinum	2009-12-15
2003	"Grandma Got Run Over by a Reindeer"	Elmo & Patsy	Legacy/Epic	Gold	2008-12-10
2003	"Santa Baby"	Eartha Kitt	Legacy	Gold	2008-12-09

=== Physical singles ===
According to the most recent record certifications, the two holiday singles with the highest RIAA certification are Elvis Presley's 1964 single "Blue Christmas" and Bruce Springsteen's 1985 single "Santa Claus Is Comin' to Town", which are certified Platinum by the RIAA (though their dates of certification occurred at least ten years after the RIAA reduced the threshold for Platinum level for singles from two million copies to one million copies).

Year of release	Title (A-side/B-side)	Artist(s)	Label	Certification award	Certification date
1965	"Blue Christmas"/ "Santa Claus Is Back in Town"	Elvis Presley	RCA Victor	Platinum	1999-07-15
1985	"Santa Claus Is Comin' to Town" (Live at C. W. Post College)	Bruce Springsteen	Columbia	Platinum	2022-05-25
1989	"This One's for the Children"/ "Funky, Funky Xmas"	New Kids on the Block	Columbia	Gold	1990-01-09
1984	"Do They Know It's Christmas?"/ "Feed the World"	Band Aid	Columbia	Gold	1984-12-19
1984	"Grandma Got Run Over by a Reindeer"	Elmo & Patsy	Epic	Gold	1989-12-27
1982	"Mickey's Christmas Carol"	(no artist listed)	Disneyland/Vista	Gold	1989-05-11
1977	"A Charlie Brown Christmas" (Story and Song)	(no artist listed)	Buena Vista	Gold	1994-03-25
1977	"Frosty the Snow Man" (Story and Song)	(no artist listed)	Disneyland/Vista	Gold	1994-03-25
1976	"Rudolph the Red-Nosed Reindeer" (Story and Song)	(no artist listed)	Disneyland/Vista	Gold	1994-03-25
1970	"The Night Before Christmas" (Story and Song)	(no artist listed)	Disneyland	Gold	1994-03-25
1959	"Alvin's Harmonica"/ "Mediocre" (David Seville)	The Chipmunks	Liberty	Gold	
1958	"The Chipmunk Song"/ "Almost Good" (David Seville)	The Chipmunks with the Music of David Seville	Liberty	Gold	
1958	"Rockin' Around the Christmas Tree"/ "Papa Noël"	Brenda Lee	Decca	Gold	
1957	"Jingle Bell Rock"/ "Captain Santa Claus (and His Reindeer Space Patrol)"	Bobby Helms	Decca	Gold	
1955	"Nuttin' for Christmas"/ "Santa Claus Looks Just Like Daddy"	Art Mooney and His Orchestra; Vocal by Barry Gordon	MGM	Gold	
1952	"I Saw Mommy Kissing Santa Claus"/ "Thumbelina"	Jimmy Boyd	Columbia	Gold	
1950	"Frosty the Snow Man"/ "When Santa Claus Gets Your Letter"	Gene Autry and The Cass County Boys	Columbia	Gold	
1949	"I Yust Go Nuts at Christmas"/ "Yingle Bells"	Yogi Yorgesson	Capitol	Gold	
1949	"Rudolph, the Red-Nosed Reindeer"/ "If It Doesn't Snow on Christmas"	Gene Autry & The Pinafores	Columbia	Gold	1969-11-10
1948	"All I Want for Christmas (Is My Two Front Teeth)"/ "Happy New Year"	Spike Jones and his City Slickers	RCA Victor	Gold	
1948	"I've Got My Love to Keep Me Warm"/ "I'm A-Tellin' You, Sam"	Les Brown and his Orchestra	Columbia	Gold	
1947	"Here Comes Santa Claus (Down Santa Claus Lane)"/ "An Old-Fashioned Christmas"	Gene Autry	Columbia	Gold	
1946	"Christmas Island"/ "Winter Wonderland"	Andrews Sisters and Guy Lombardo and His Royal Canadians	Decca	Gold	
1946	"The Christmas Song (Merry Christmas to You)"/ "In the Cool of Evening"	The King Cole Trio	Capitol	Gold	
1944	"White Christmas"/ "If You Are But a Dream"	Frank Sinatra	Columbia	Gold	
1943	"I'll Be Home for Christmas (If Only in My Dreams)"/ "Danny Boy"	Bing Crosby	Decca	Gold	
1943	"Jingle Bells"/ "Santa Claus Is Comin' to Town"	Bing Crosby and the Andrews Sisters	Decca	Gold	
1942	"White Christmas"/ "Let's Start the New Year Right"	Bing Crosby	Decca	Gold	
1942	"White Christmas"/ "Abraham"	Freddy Martin and his Orchestra	Victor	Gold	
1935	"Silent Night"/ "Adeste Fideles (O Come, All Ye Faithful)"	Bing Crosby	Decca	Gold	

== See also ==
- Billboard Christmas Holiday Charts
- Christmas music
- List of Christmas hit singles in the United Kingdom
- List of popular Christmas singles in the United States
- List of best-selling Christmas albums in the United States
- List of Christmas carols
