= Ghost in the Ruins – A Tribute to Criss Oliva =

Live album by Savatage
- Released: December 15, 1995
- Recorded: 1987–1990
- Genres: Heavy metal, power metal, progressive metal
- Length: 63:51
- Labels: Nuclear Blast America (US); Fresh Fruit/SPV (Germany); Zero Corporation (Japan)
- Producers: Paul O'Neill, Jon Oliva

Savatage chronology
Dead Winter Dead (1995)	Ghost in the Ruins – A Tribute to Criss Oliva (1995)	The Wake of Magellan (1997)

Final Bell cover

Professional ratings
Review scores
Source	Rating
Collector's Guide to Heavy Metal	8/10
Metal Hammer (GER)	7/7
Rock Hard	10/10

Ghost in the Ruins – A Tribute to Criss Oliva is a live album by the American heavy metal band Savatage, recorded between 1987 and 1990. Many of the tracks on this album have since been added to the re-releases of other albums in the Savatage discography by the German label SPV in 2002. The Japanese version of the album, titled Final Bell – Tribute to Christopher Michael Oliva and released by Zero Corporation in 1997, shows the track "Criss Intro" as "Criss Oliva Guitar Solo" on the track listing.

== Track listing ==
No.	Title	Writer(s)	Recorded at	Length
1.	"City Beneath the Surface"	Criss Oliva, Jon Oliva	The Ritz in New York City, 1990	5:39
2.	"24 Hours Ago"	C. Oliva, J. Oliva, Johnny Lee Middleton, Paul O'Neill	The Spectrum, Philadelphia, 1988	4:48
3.	"Legions"	C. Oliva, J. Oliva	The Spectrum, Philadelphia, 1988	5:06
4.	"Strange Wings"	C. Oliva, J. Oliva, O'Neill	The Spectrum, Philadelphia, 1988	4:01
5.	"Gutter Ballet"	C. Oliva, J. Oliva, O'Neill	Los Angeles Palace, 1990	6:14
6.	"Temptation Revelation / When the Crowds Are Gone"	C. Oliva, J. Oliva, O'Neill	Hollywood Palace, 1990	7:10
7.	"Of Rage and War"	C. Oliva, J. Oliva, O'Neill	Lamour, Brooklyn, 1990	4:29
8.	"The Dungeons Are Calling"	C. Oliva, J. Oliva, Keith Collins	Nassau Coliseum, Long Island, 1988	4:48
9.	"Sirens"	C. Oliva, J. Oliva	Nassau Coliseum, Long Island, 1988	3:37
10.	"Hounds"	C. Oliva, J. Oliva, O'Neill	Lamour, Brooklyn, 1990	7:20
11.	"Criss Intro" (instrumental)	C. Oliva	Agora, Cleveland, 1987	1:13
12.	"Hall of the Mountain King"	C. Oliva, J. Oliva, Middleton, O'Neill	Lamour, Brooklyn, 1990	6:38
13.	"Post Script" (instrumental)	C. Oliva	Sound check, Hollywood Palace, 1990	1:42

2011 EarMusic CD reissue
No.	Title	Writer(s)	Recorded at	Length
14.	"Devastation"	C. Oliva, J. Oliva	Agora, Cleveland, 1987	3:37
15.	"Stare into the Sun" (acoustic version)	J. Oliva, O'Neill		4:55

== Personnel ==
Savatage

- Jon Oliva – lead vocals, piano, co-producer
- Criss Oliva – lead guitar, acoustic guitar
- Chris Caffery – rhythm guitar
- Johnny Lee Middleton – bass guitar
- Steve "Doc" Wacholz – drums and percussion

Production

- Paul O'Neill – producer
- Robert Kinkel – engineer
- Ken Lewis, Joe Johnson, Mike Scielzi, Joe Daily – additional engineering
- Steve Corson – assistant engineer
- Dave Whittman – mixing at Soundtrack Studios, New York
- Ben Arrindell – mixing assistant
- Leon Zervos – mastering
