= Christmas Canon =

Single by Trans-Siberian Orchestra

from the album The Christmas Attic
- Released: November 20, 2001
- Recorded: 1998
- Genre: Christmas, Classical Crossover
- Length: 4:19
- Label: Lava
- Composer: Johann Pachelbel
- Lyricist: Paul O'Neill
- Producers: Paul O'Neill; Robert Kinkel

Trans-Siberian Orchestra singles chronology
"The World That He Sees" (1998)	"Christmas Canon" (2001)	"Queen of the Winter Night" (2004)

"Christmas Canon" is a Christmas song by the Trans-Siberian Orchestra (TSO) from their 1998 album The Christmas Attic.

The song is set to the tune of Johann Pachelbel's Canon in D Major with new lyrics added. The style is a departure from TSO's usual rock arrangements, instead being performed in the style of a children's choir with light accompaniment from piano and strings. The group would later create a rock version of the song, entitled "Christmas Canon Rock" with Jennifer Cella on lead vocals, which debuted on their 2004 album The Lost Christmas Eve.

As of November 25, 2016, total sales of the digital track stand at 918,000 downloads according to Nielsen SoundScan, placing it seventh on the list of all-time best-selling Christmas/holiday digital singles in SoundScan history.

== Chart history ==
Chart (2005)	Peak position
US Digital	39

Chart (2011)	Peak position
Holiday 100	9

== Certifications ==
Region	Certification	Certified units/sales
United States (RIAA)	2× Platinum	2,000,000^{‡}
^{‡} Sales+streaming figures based on certification alone.

== See also ==
- "What Child Is This?", a Christmas song based on the classical piece "Greensleeves"
