= The Lost Christmas Eve =

Studio album by Trans-Siberian Orchestra
- Released: October 12, 2004
- Recorded: 2004
- Studio: Soundtracks Recording Studio, New York, NY
- Genre: Symphonic metal; rock opera; Christmas rock; neoclassical metal
- Length: 74:29
- Label: Lava/Atlantic
- Producer: Paul O'Neill; Robert Kinkel (co-producer); Dave Wittman (Recording and Mix Engineer)

Trans-Siberian Orchestra chronology
Beethoven's Last Night (2000)	The Lost Christmas Eve (2004)	Night Castle (2009)

Alternative Cover
- Narrated Version of "The Lost Christmas Eve".

Singles from The Lost Christmas Eve
- 1. "Queen of the Winter Night" Released: 2004; 2. "Wizards in Winter" Released: 2006

Professional ratings
Review scores
Source	Rating
Allmusic	3/5 stars

The Lost Christmas Eve is the fourth studio album by the Trans-Siberian Orchestra. It was released on October 12, 2004, and is the last album in their "Christmas trilogy", with Christmas Eve and Other Stories (1996) and The Christmas Attic (1998) coming before it. All three albums, as well as their The Ghosts of Christmas Eve DVD, were featured in the box set of The Christmas Trilogy. In 2012, Trans-Siberian Orchestra toured a live production of The Lost Christmas Eve for the first time and performed the rock opera in over 100 arena shows across North America. In late October 2013, TSO released a narrated version of The Lost Christmas Eve much like they did in 2012 with Beethoven's Last Night.

The Lost Christmas Eve was certified Gold by the Recording Industry Association of America in five weeks. On March 27, 2013, the album was certified Double Platinum for shipment of two million copies in the United States since its 2004 release. As of November 2014, The Lost Christmas Eve is the twentieth best-selling Christmas/holiday album in the United States during the SoundScan era of music sales tracking (March 1991 – present), having sold 2,380,000 copies according to SoundScan.

== Storyline ==
The Lost Christmas Eve is the final installment in TSO's Christmas trilogy. "The record continues the tradition of its two predecessors by telling a musical tale of loss and redemption, this one encompassing a rundown hotel, an old toy store, a blues bar, a gothic cathedral and their respective inhabitants, whose destinies are intertwined by a single enchanted evening in New York City.

The story starts with a teardrop of infinite sorrow falling from the heavens towards a business man who forty years prior had abandoned his newborn son to a state run institution, and how there is something about Christmas Eve that allows humans to correct mistakes we have made in our lives.

In this symphonic tale, God's youngest angel is once again sent on a mission to bring his Lord the name of the person who best continued his Son's work on Earth. However, unlike his other journeys, the angel could only use his wings twice, once when he descended to Earth and once more when he left. Looking for a likely place to search, the angel decided to land in New York City.

As soon as he touched the ground, he notices a street performer weaving a story about the Imperial Wizards Ball of Winter to a group of children. He then entered a hotel, and as he enters the ballroom, he encounters inhabitants from the future and the past. Then he leaves and walks into a blues club, where a jazz band is playing music, eventually the whole bar gets together and starts singing along with the band, except for one man who leaves without a word refusing to be involved in this yule tide cheer.

The angel noticed that the man left a trail of blood. The blood came from a wound in the man's soul combined with unwept tears that only an angel could see. As he followed the man, who had been walking home from work, the angel peered into the man's heart to find the reason behind the man's wounded soul.

As the angel delved into the man's past, he saw that he had not always hated Christmas and in fact loved it like any other child. His family was a good Christian one, and he had been taught that all men are created in God's image. He eventually got married, and his wife became pregnant. On the night of the birth, things were going as planned and normal. However, the man then noticed that there were many doctors rushing to his wife's room, but there were none leaving. The doctor told him that during the birth, she had hemorrhaged and that, unfortunately, they were unable to save her. When a nurse, in an effort to console him, gave him his son who had survived, the infant appeared sickly. The doctor explained that because the mother had hemorrhaged blood so badly, the baby had been cut from oxygen for so long that he suffered permanent brain damage; he would be unable to function as a normal person in adulthood and would be lucky if he learned to walk. Enraged by this outcome, the man screams towards heaven, that if man is made in God's image that he saw nothing of God in his son. The man gave the baby back to the nurse and asked if the child could be placed into a state facility.

After seeing this, the angel let go of the man, who did not notice the angel peering into him. He later encountered a young girl, dressed in a Russian Imperial style winter coat, in front of a toy store. The girl claimed to be staying with her parents at the hotel across the street on the twelfth floor in room twenty four. She asked him if he had any children. The man responded with a short and gruff "No," but he knew that he lied, and for the first time in decades he thinks about him and the son. The man told the girl to go back to her room in the hotel, then called a cab and set off to find his son.

Eventually, he arrived at a hospital, similar to the one where his son was born, and asked about his son. A nurse took him to a room where the son, now a grown man, was rocking babies born to crack cocaine addicted mothers to sleep. When the man asked if his son could talk, the nurse, realizing that it had been a while since they had met said "No, but he's a good listener." After so many years, father and son are reunited.

The father asked his son to move out of the complex he lived in to stay with him, to which he agreed. They then took a cab to the hotel near the toy store to find the girl and asked for the girl's room. However, there was no twelfth floor to the hotel, nor had there even been any children there the entire week. Confused, the man returned to the cab with his son. The man then took out his briefcase and spilled its contents out on the sidewalk including a folder containing his son's possessions including a picture of his wife as a little girl that he had never seen before. The son gave a puzzled look, to which the man explained that he was going to quit his job to get a job at the hospital where his son worked. The son gleefully smiled.

When the angel returned to Heaven to report to his Lord, the angel at first gave the name of the man's son, but then after a moment of hesitation added the name of the story teller, the jazz player, and all of the other people he had seen, even the father. It was at this point that the angel realized that everyone continues the work of his Son when they "Do unto others as you would have others do unto you."

== Track listing ==
No.	Title	Length
1.	"Faith Noel" (Instrumental)	4:32
2.	"The Lost Christmas Eve"	5:33
3.	"Christmas Dreams"	3:54
4.	"Wizards in Winter" (Instrumental)	3:06
5.	"Remember"	3:25
6.	"Anno Domine"	2:13
7.	"Christmas Concerto" (Instrumental)	0:42
8.	"Queen of the Winter Night" (Instrumental)	3:11
9.	"Christmas Nights in Blue"	4:18
10.	"Christmas Jazz" (Instrumental)	2:16
11.	"Christmas Jam"	3:47
12.	"Siberian Sleigh Ride" (Instrumental)	3:08
13.	"What Is Christmas?"	2:51
14.	"For the Sake of Our Brother"	3:10
15.	"The Wisdom of Snow" (Instrumental)	2:00
16.	"Wish Liszt (Toy Shop Madness)" (Instrumental)	3:42
17.	"Back to a Reason (Part II)"	4:52
18.	"Christmas Bells, Carousels & Time" (Instrumental)	1:00
19.	"What Child Is This?"	6:00
20.	"O Come All Ye Faithful" (Instrumental)	1:30
21.	"Christmas Canon Rock"	4:57
22.	"Different Wings"	2:44
23.	"Midnight Clear" (Instrumental)	1:38

== References to other media ==
- "Back to a Reason (Part II)" is a sequel to the Savatage song "Back to a Reason", on their 2001 release Poets and Madmen.
  - Part of the music of "Back to a Reason" can be heard in the instrumental "The Wisdom of Snow" from 0:28 to 1:15.
- "Queen of the Winter Night" is a re-working of the Wolfgang Amadeus Mozart opera The Magic Flute (specifically, the Der Hölle Rache kocht in meinem Herzen aria).
- "Wish Liszt" is a re-working of "Hungarian Rhapsody No. 2" by Franz Liszt.
- "Christmas Canon Rock" is a re-working of "Christmas Canon" (originally found on The Christmas Attic), which is in turn a re-working of Pachelbel's Canon in D. Unlike "Christmas Canon", "Christmas Canon Rock" does not feature a children's choir, rather using electric guitars, a drum kit, a bass guitar, guitar solos and Jennifer Cella on lead vocals accompanied by backing vocals. "Christmas Canon Rock" is also performed in the key of A instead of the traditional key of D. It is frequently performed in place of "Christmas Canon" at live concerts where a children's choir is unavailable.
- "Wizards in Winter" is an instrumental song that gained fame as the backing music for Carson Williams' home-made light show.
- "Christmas Jazz" is a re-working of the holiday standard "Good King Wenceslas."

== Reception ==
The album is certified double platinum by the Recording Industry Association of America. As of December 2014, it has sold 2,380,000 copies in the United States.

== See also ==
- List of Billboard Top Holiday Albums number ones of the 2000s
