= The Ghosts of Christmas Eve =

1999 film by Hart Perry

- Written by: Paul O'Neill
- Directed by: Hart Perry
- Starring: Ossie Davis; Allie Sheridan
- Narrated by: Ossie Davis
- Music by: Paul O'Neill; Robert Kinkel; Jon Oliva

Production
- Producers: Paul O'Neill; Taro Meyer; Michael Owen
- Production locations: Loew's Jersey Theatre, Jersey City, New Jersey
- Running time: 46 minutes

Original release
- Network: Fox Family Channel
- Release: December 14, 1999

The Ghosts of Christmas Eve is a 1999 made-for-television film showcasing a Christmas music performance by Trans-Siberian Orchestra, starring Ossie Davis and Allie Sheridan. Guest performers included Michael Crawford and Jewel. Other performers include Bob Kinkel, Al Pitrelli, Chris Caffery, Johnny Lee Middleton, Jeff Plate, Tony Gaynor, Daryl Pediford and Tommy Farese. The film premiered on Fox Family Channel on December 14, 1999.

== Plot ==
The songs are presented in such a way as to form a storyline about a runaway who takes refuge in an abandoned theatre on Christmas Eve, and experiences the musical performances as ghostly visions from the theatre's past. Ossie Davis as the caretaker, Allie Sheridan as the runaway, a special guest appearance by Joseph Jankovic as part of the children’s choir, and Jennifer Sheridan and TSO vocalist Tommy Farese as the runaway's parents are used to fill out the narrative. The special was filmed at the historic Loew's Jersey Theatre in Jersey City, New Jersey.

It premiered on Fox Family on December 14, 1999, as part of their 25 Days of Christmas programming block. On November 13, 2001, it was released on DVD with the Timeless Version of "Christmas Eve/Sarajevo 12/24" included as a bonus track.

The lost child, Allie Sheridan, would go on to perform with TSO during their 2003 tour.

This story was performed live for the 2015, 2016, 2017, 2018, 2022, and 2023 winter tours, and is going to be performed for the 2025 winter tour.

== List of songs ==
1. "O Come All Ye Faithful / O Holy Night"
2. "Good King Joy"
3. "Hark! The Herald Angels Sing" (featuring Jewel)
4. "Christmas Eve/Sarajevo 12/24"
5. "Christmas Canon"
6. "O Holy Night" (featuring Michael Crawford)
7. "Music Box Blues"
8. "Promises to Keep"
9. "This Christmas Day"
10. "First Snow"

== Reception ==
The New York Times reviewer said, "the Trans-Siberian Orchestra has carried out a mission to create powerful artistry in music through the webbing of songs together by means of storytelling...artists like Jewel and Michael Crawford bring their own unique twists to a musical exploration of art and the Christmas spirit."
