= Carson Williams (electrical engineer) =

American electrical engineer (born 1964/65)

- Born: 1964 or 1965 (age 61–62)
- Occupation: Computer engineer
- Years active: 2004–present
- Spouse: Sherry Williams
- Children: 2

Carson Williams (born 1964/65) is a computer engineer from Mason, Ohio who is noted for his light shows using Christmas lights affixed to and around his house. The lights are programmed and synchronized to turn on and off with music using a computer application and set of controllers from the Light-O-Rama company. For each minute of animation synchronized to music, he spent approximately one hour to sequence 88 Light-O-Rama channels to control his 16,000 Christmas lights. His notability suddenly increased when a popular clip was widely circulated on the internet in late 2005 showing a recording of one of his shows from 2004, accompanied by the track "Wizards in Winter" by the Trans-Siberian Orchestra.

With permission from both of his neighbors, he put on various displays each year at his home. Typical light shows ran between 6 p.m. and 10 p.m. each night. Viewers heard the music on an FM broadcast in their cars. This kept the speaker noise level down for his neighbors.

However, on December 6, 2005, Carson closed the light display indefinitely due to immense traffic congestion in his subdivision; there was a car accident in that area and police were unable to reach the site due to the heavy traffic that had built up.

Williams's Christmas display proved so popular that it was featured in a Miller Lite beer commercial in December 2005. In fact, the TSO song was so popular that many other individuals have used the same song in their own Christmas display. Subsequently, the Trans-Siberian Orchestra adopted a digitally-remastered version of the original as its own "Official Video" for Wizards in Winter, and posted it to YouTube on October 26, 2009.

A light show similar to Williams' "Wizards in Winter" was used in a commercial for the UK's National Lottery, although according to a press release the advertising campaign "was created by Abbott Mead Vickers BBDO". No mention of Carson Williams' light show was made.

Building on his internet fame, he started a custom animation lighting business. ConsarLights.com is a business to provide custom designed holiday lighting.

In November 2006, Williams decided to revive the display and move the show to Heritage Oak Park in Mason, Ohio. The show was converted into a "drive-through" style show and admission was charged on a per-car basis.

According to a promotional video, officials at the Northfield Stapleton Shopping Center found Williams' house lights video on the internet and asked him to design a new show in Denver, Colorado, on a commercial scale. Created with Parker 3D, the show featured over 250,000 LED lights drawing 150 amperes of electric current. It used several Trans-Siberian Orchestra songs, including "Wizards in Winter," "Christmas Eve/Sarajevo 12/24" and "Christmas Canon". "Symphony In Lights" was a free show open to the public that ran through the month of December 2006.

For 2007, Consar Lights programmed new light shows designed by Parker 3D for The Promenade Bolingbrook in the Chicago Metropolitan Area, and the Yorkdale Shopping Centre in Toronto.

== See also ==
- Christmas lights
- Lithgow Lights, a similar display in Lithgow, Australia
