= Christmas Eve and Other Stories =

Studio album by Trans-Siberian Orchestra
- Released: October 15, 1996
- Recorded: 1995–1996
- Studios: Soundtrack Studios and Studio 900 (overdubs), New York City
- Genres: Christmas; hard rock
- Length: 62:03
- Label: Lava/Atlantic
- Producers: Paul O'Neill; Robert Kinkel (co.)

Trans-Siberian Orchestra chronology
Christmas Eve and Other Stories (1996)	The Christmas Attic (1998)

Singles from Christmas Eve and Other Stores
- 1. "Christmas Eve/Sarajevo 12/24" Released: October 1996

Christmas Eve and Other Stories is the debut studio album by American symphonic metal band Trans-Siberian Orchestra. It was released on October 15, 1996, through Lava Records and Atlantic Records. It is the first album in the band's "Christmas trilogy", with The Christmas Attic (1998) and The Lost Christmas Eve (2004) coming afterward. All three albums, as well as their The Ghosts of Christmas Eve DVD, were featured in the box set of The Christmas Trilogy. The album's cover art was created by Edgar Jerins.

The album became one of the best-selling Christmas albums of all time in the U.S. and has been certified 3× platinum by the RIAA for selling 3 million copies in the US. As of November 2016, the album track "Christmas Eve/Sarajevo 12/24" has sold 1.3 million downloads, becoming one of the best-selling Christmas songs of all time in the US as well.

== Commercial performance ==
As of November 2014, Christmas Eve and Other Stories was the ninth best-selling Christmas/holiday album in the United States during the Nielsen SoundScan era of music sales tracking (1991 – present), with sales of 3,430,000 copies according to SoundScan. On November 28, 2011, Christmas Eve and Other Stories was certified 3× platinum by the Recording Industry Association of America for shipment of three million copies in the United States.

== Plot summary ==
On Christmas Eve in 1995, a young man wanders into a bar and orders a whiskey. Soon after, he is joined by an old man who soon begins a story, telling of how God sent an angel down to Earth to find and bring him an example of kindness done in the spirit of Christmas ("An Angel Came Down"). While flying down, he overhears church bells ringing carols ("O Come All Ye Faithful/O Holy Night"), as he flew closer, a single voice rang out in the church, later joined by a full choir ("A Star to Follow").

With the song over, the angel continued his search, the skies now snowing as he flies over the world ("First Snow"). Flying over the Ural Mountains, he notices a small village, where he takes upon the disguise of a human to approach the people ("The Silent Nutcracker"). The angel asks a village peasant what Russian hearts desire for Christmas, with the peasant simply answering "peace on earth" ("A Mad Russian's Christmas"). The angel returns to flight, thinking about the birth of Christ, and its impact upon Christmas Day ("The Prince of Peace"). The angel then flies over Bosnia during the siege of Sarajevo, witnessing mass destruction and violent warfare below. Confused as to why individuals would kill each other, the angel flies close to a recent battlefield, where a single cello player stood alone playing a forgotten Christmas song. While departing, the angel realized that as long as there was music, there would always be hope ("Christmas Eve/Sarajevo 12/24").

Flying over the countryside, the angel heard a voice begin to sing from a church below. The angel reached out and held the song in his hand, wondering if it was the answer he was seeking; however, he still believed there was something missing, and continued his journey into the night ("Good King Joy"). The angel soon overhears a prayer to God from a man in distress. Listening closer, he discovers that the man's daughter is lost, and his only prayer was for her to be home for Christmas ("Ornament").

Professional ratings
Review scores
Source	Rating
AllMusic	4/5 stars
Collector's Guide to Heavy Metal	8/10

The angel made it his personal mission to bring the girl home, and he followed the man's prayer to an old bar in New York City, where he found her standing outside, wishing upon the neon sign to come home, as there were no stars to wish upon ("The First Noel"). A young child entered the bar and asked the bartender if they knew of the lost girl outside. The bartender asked the child how he knew the girl was lost, to which the child told the bartender that on Christmas Eve, if someone were to be home, they would already be there. Moved by this realization, the bartender took money from the cash register, and paid for a taxi cab to take the girl to John F. Kennedy International Airport to help her get home ("Old City Bar").

The angel was moved by this gesture, and truly believed this to be the example of kindness that he had been looking for ("Promises to Keep"). As the girl finally arrived home to her father, the Angel flew back up to Heaven, bringing God back his shining example of kindness during Christmastime ("This Christmas Day"). The old man then concluded his story, and thanked the young man for his company as he left the bar. The young man then rushed outside to thank the old man; however, he discovered he was already gone, and had left no footprints. Walking back home, he realized that for the first time since his childhood, he'd finally dreamed and believed in Christmas again ("An Angel Returned").

== Track listing ==
All new lyrics by Paul O'Neill.

No.	Title	Writer(s)	Length
1.	"An Angel Came Down"	Franz Gruber, O'Neill, Jon Oliva	3:52
2.	"O Come All Ye Faithful/O Holy Night" (instrumental)	John Francis Wade, Frederick Oakeley, John Reading, Adolphe Adam, John Sullivan Dwight, O'Neill, Robert Kinkel	4:19
3.	"A Star to Follow"	O'Neill	3:49
4.	"First Snow" (instrumental)	O'Neill	3:53
5.	"The Silent Nutcracker" (instrumental)	O'Neill	2:22
6.	"A Mad Russian's Christmas" (Cover of Tchaikovsky's The Nutcracker, Act 2, No 2: Trepak (Russian Dance); instrumental)	Pyotr Ilyich Tchaikovsky, Kinkel	4:42
7.	"The Prince of Peace"	Felix Mendelssohn, Charles Wesley, O'Neill	3:33
8.	"Christmas Eve/Sarajevo 12/24" (medley of "God Rest Ye Merry, Gentlemen" and "Shchedryk" (better known as the melody of "Carol of the Bells"); same recording released in 1995 by Savatage; instrumental)	O'Neill, Kinkel, Oliva	3:25
9.	"Good King Joy"	Lowell Mason, Kinkel, O'Neill	6:36
10.	"Ornament"	O'Neill, Oliva	3:37
11.	"The First Noel" (instrumental)	Traditional, O'Neill	0:55
12.	"Old City Bar"	O'Neill	6:18
13.	"Promises to Keep"	O'Neill, Kinkel	2:41
14.	"This Christmas Day"	O'Neill, Oliva	4:20
15.	"An Angel Returned"	O'Neill, Oliva	3:52

Bonus tracks
No.	Title	Writer(s)	Length
16.	"O Holy Night" (instrumental)	Adam, Dwight	2:39
17.	"God Rest Ye Merry Gentlemen" (instrumental)	Traditional	1:16

Target bonus tracks
No.	Title	Length
18.	"Whoville Medley (Perfect Christmas Night/Grinch)"	2:38
19.	"The World That He Sees"	4:43

== Charts ==
=== Weekly ===
Weekly chart performance for Christmas Eve and Other Stories
Chart	Peak position	Peak year
US Billboard 200	48	2012
US Top Christian Albums (Billboard)	1	2022
US Heatseekers Albums (Billboard)	3	1996
US Top Album Sales (Billboard)	89	2019
US Top Rock Albums (Billboard)	8	2022
US Top Holiday Albums (Billboard)	3	2003

=== Year-end ===
Year-end chart performance for Christmas Eve and Other Stories
Chart (2025)	Position
US Top Christian Albums (Billboard)	48

== Certifications ==
Region	Certification	Certified units/sales
United States (RIAA)	3× Platinum	3,000,000^{^}
^{^} Shipments figures based on certification alone.
