= Wizards in Winter =

Single by Trans-Siberian Orchestra

from the album The Lost Christmas Eve
- Released: October 2004
- Genre: Symphonic metal, progressive rock, Christmas music
- Length: 3:05
- Label: Atlantic/Lava
- Songwriters: Paul O'Neill, Robert Kinkel
- Producers: Paul O'Neill, Robert Kinkel

Audio sample
- "Wizards in Winter" exhibits the rock orchestra style of Trans-Siberian Orchestra.: file; help

"Wizards in Winter" is an instrumental track by Trans-Siberian Orchestra, released on the 2004 album The Lost Christmas Eve. A clip of the band playing the first few seconds of the piece was used in a commercial for its most recent concert tour, and the song is often used to open their live shows. Its musical style incorporates progressive rock, symphonic metal, and heavy metal, with influences from classical music.

== Christmas lights phenomenon ==
During the 2004 Christmas season, electrical engineer Carson Williams set up a Christmas light show in the front yard, driveway, windows, and roof of his house. It took him about two months and 16,000 lights. The lights were synchronized to the music, and the show was free for anyone passing by who tuned to a specific low-power FM frequency on their car radio. It is also available to download on iTunes as a music video. A still image of the light show serves as the cover art for the single.

A three-minute video of the show playing circulated widely on the Internet, and also spawned many others who imitated the style of setting their Christmas lights to this and other songs. It was later adapted by Miller Brewing Company into a 30-second TV advertisement for Miller Lite that aired on U.S. stations in late 2005.

A similar animation was used in a commercial for the UK's National Lottery, although, according to a press release, the advertising campaign "was created by Abbott Mead Vickers BBDO". No mention of Carson Williams' light show was made. The advertisement can be seen on the tellyads.com website.

The piece is also used in Jordan's Furniture's 2009 Christmas LITE (Laser Imagination Theater Experience) show. Tesla Motors have also used it in December 2015 in the Merry Model X-Mas teaser video for the Tesla Model X, and in December 2016 activated the show in all customer cars. Disney used the piece for a segment of World of Color: Season of Light, featuring Goofy putting up his Christmas lights to the track.

== Chart positions ==
| Chart (2006) | Peak position |
|---|---|
| US Adult Contemporary (Billboard) | 18 |
| US Digital Song Sales (Billboard) | 72 |
| US Rock Digital Songs (Billboard) | 38 |

== Certifications ==
| Region | Certification | Certified units/sales |
|---|---|---|
| United States (RIAA) | Platinum | 1,000,000^{‡} |
^{‡} Sales+streaming figures based on certification alone.
