= Beethoven's Last Night =

Studio album by Trans-Siberian Orchestra
- Released: April 11, 2000
- Recorded: 1999
- Genre: Symphonic rock; progressive rock; neoclassical metal
- Length: 73:00
- Label: Warner Music Group; Atlantic
- Producer: Paul O'Neill; Robert Kinkel

Trans-Siberian Orchestra chronology
The Christmas Attic (1998)	Beethoven's Last Night (2000)	The Lost Christmas Eve (2004)

Alternative cover
- Narrated Version of "Beethoven's Last Night"

Professional ratings
Review scores
Source	Rating
AllMusic	3/5 stars

Beethoven's Last Night is a rock opera by the Trans-Siberian Orchestra, released in 2000. The album tells the fictional story of Ludwig van Beethoven on the last night of his life, as the devil, Mephistopheles, comes to collect his soul. With the help of Fate and her son Twist, Beethoven unwittingly tricks the devil and is allowed to keep his soul which he had thought lost, but that the devil had no claim on. The opera features many classical crossover rock songs which are clearly based on melodies from classical music, particularly Beethoven's works. It is the first Trans-Siberian Orchestra album that does not feature Christmas themes. The original cover art was created by Edgar Jerins, and re-issued cover art was created by Greg Hildebrandt.

== Story ==
Late one night in the spring of 1827 (presumably March 26, the night he died), Ludwig van Beethoven has completed his masterpiece, his tenth symphony (which, in reality, was never completed).

Just as this work is finished, Fate and her deformed son Twist (as in 'Twist of Fate') arrive in the composer's home, and inform him of what he had expected for a long while: that this night was the night of his death ("Midnight", "Fate").

After this explanation, the devil Mephistopheles arrives to claim Beethoven's soul ("Mephistopheles"). He offers the composer a deal; Mephistopheles will allow Beethoven to keep his soul if he may erase the memory of Beethoven's works from all mankind. Beethoven is given one hour to consider, and Mephistopheles leaves the room.

Beethoven turns his anger to Fate at having been dealt a hard life, and now, this decision ("What Is Eternal"). In consolation, Fate allows Beethoven to travel back through his life in order to review it and make any changes that he wishes. Beethoven accepts this, and they begin with Beethoven's experiences as a child.

Beethoven comes into his room while the young Beethoven has just been slapped by a tutor for failing to receive appointment to the Imperial Court ("The Moment"). Beethoven turns to Fate and informs her that he did not need the hardships that he had faced, with his mother dead and a painful childhood. He requests that she remove the experience from his life. After being told that such a request would remove the inspiration for his sixth symphony, he changes his mind.

Fate and Beethoven then go to one of Beethoven's happier moments, meeting the composer Wolfgang Amadeus Mozart in the city of Vienna ("Vienna", "Mozart"). Fate then reminds Beethoven of his "immortal beloved" Theresa ("The Dreams of Candlelight"), and after experiencing a fond remembrance, Beethoven explains his reasons for needing to leave her.

The pair venture to when Beethoven first realizes his deafness ("Requiem"), and Beethoven explains that Theresa would not love him were she to know. He is then shown Theresa's reaction to his unexplained absence ("I'll Keep Your Secrets"), and he realizes that his deafness is the cause of all his problems ("The Dark"). Fate explains that if she cures his deafness, his music will suffer, as the Muses would not be heard as easily through the everyday sound. He thus withdraws his request.

Beethoven is then shown that Theresa would have loved him forever ("After The Fall"), and he becomes very sorrowful. But Fate then offers visions of the countless musicians of the future who would be influenced by Beethoven's works. As one last, ultimate vision ("A Last Illusion"), he is allowed to improvise with the musicians of the past and future who were inspired by him. Realizing that removing the hardships from his life would destroy his music, Beethoven informs Fate that he will not change any part of his life ("This Is Who You Are").

At this point, Mephistopheles returns ("Mephistopheles' Return") and Beethoven informs the devil that he will not allow his music to be destroyed. Desperate to receive the Tenth Symphony, Mephistopheles makes another deal: if Beethoven will give over only the Tenth Symphony, then Mephistopheles will not take the composer's soul. After an appearance by Mozart's ghost, Beethoven refuses this offer as well. As a final tactic, Mephistopheles points out the window to a young orphan, and describes the tortures that she will receive if Beethoven refuses to hand over his music ("Misery"). Heartbroken, Beethoven agrees to hand over his Tenth Symphony ("Who Is This Child"). After Twist's prompting, a contract is drawn up by Fate, stating the following:

It is agreed upon this night, March 26, 1827, between the undersigned, that the music of the Tenth Symphony, composed by Ludwig van Beethoven, first born son of Johann and Maria van Beethoven, of the city of Bonn, shall henceforth be the property of Mephistopheles, Lord of Darkness and first fallen from the grace of God. It is also understood that it is his intention to remove any signs of this music from the memory of man for all eternity. In exchange for the destruction of the aforementioned music it is also agreed that Mephistopheles and all his minions will remove themselves from the life of the child presently sleeping in the gutter directly across from the window of this room. This removal of influence is to be commenced immediately upon signing and to be enforced for all eternity.

_____________________
Ludwig van Beethoven

_____________________
Mephistopheles

The contract is signed by both the parties, after which Mephistopheles thrusts the Tenth Symphony over a lit candle. When it does not burn, the fact is revealed that Beethoven is in fact the second-born son of his parents by the name Ludwig van Beethoven, and thus, the contract does not apply to his music.

After Mephistopheles leaves in a fit of rage, it is revealed that the true destination of Beethoven's soul is actually heaven (as Twist explains, the devil was simply lying to him all along). Fate tells him to rest ("A Final Dream"), and Beethoven's soul leaves his body for the great beyond. However, Twist also hides the manuscript for the tenth symphony.

== Reissue ==
On March 13, 2012, Beethoven's Last Night: The Complete Narrated Version was released and made available exclusively at Wal-Mart stores and TSO concerts. This two-disc deluxe edition includes all of the music from the original release and, for the first time, the narration featured during live performances of the album. It comes packaged with a booklet filled with illustrations of the story, plus the full lyrics and narration. The narration is performed by Bryan Hicks.

== Track listing ==
No.	Title	Musical reference	Length
1.	"Overture" (instrumental)	Moonlight Sonata, Sonata Pathétique, fourth movement from Symphony No. 9, Symphony No. 5, Mozart's Requiem	2:58
2.	"Midnight"		2:10
3.	"Fate"		1:18
4.	"What Good This Deafness"		1:46
5.	"Mephistopheles"	Moonlight Sonata	3:48
6.	"What Is Eternal"	Moonlight Sonata, Ode to Joy from Symphony No. 9	4:41
7.	"The Moment"	Symphony No. 6	2:47
8.	"Vienna"		3:32
9.	"Mozart" (instrumental)	Le nozze di Figaro Overture (Mozart)	3:17
10.	"The Dreams of Candlelight"	Chopin's Op 68 Mazurka No. 3	4:05
11.	"Requiem (The Fifth)"	Mozart's Requiem, Symphony No. 5	3:00
12.	"I'll Keep Your Secrets"		4:15
13.	"The Dark"		4:27
14.	"Für Elise" (instrumental)	Für Elise	0:45
15.	"After the Fall"		4:35
16.	"A Last Illusion"	Sonata facile (Mozart), Ode to Joy from Symphony No. 9, Flight of the Bumblebee (Nikolai Rimsky-Korsakov)	5:34
17.	"This Is Who You Are"		3:58
18.	"Beethoven" (instrumental)	Scherzo from Symphony No. 9, Sonata Pathétique	2:56
19.	"Mephistopheles' Return"	Sonata Pathétique	4:27
20.	"Misery"		2:45
21.	"Who Is This Child"		4:33
22.	"A Final Dream"		1:54

== Characters ==
- Ludwig van Beethoven — The eponymous composer. Note: In the original release, TSO refers to him as Ludwig von Beethoven; the reissue correctly uses van.
- Fate — The spirit of Fate
- Twist — Fate's son (as in "Twist of Fate")
- Mephistopheles — The devil
- Young Beethoven — Beethoven as a young man
- Wolfgang Amadeus Mozart — A famous composer before Beethoven achieved fame
- Theresa — Beethoven's "immortal beloved": possibly either Countess Thérèse von Brunswick or Therese Malfatti
- Young Girl — An orphan of the streets
- The Muses — The spirits of artistic inspiration

== Vocalists ==
- Jody Ashworth – Beethoven
- Patti Russo – Theresa
- Jon Oliva – Mephistopheles
- Guy Lemmonnier – Young Beethoven
- Jamie Torcellini – Twist
- Sylvia Tosun – Fate
- Zak Stevens – The Muses
- Dave Diamond – The Muses
- Doug Thoms – The Muses

== Orchestra ==
- Paul O'Neill - guitar
- Al Pitrelli - guitar
- Chris Caffery - guitar
- Johnny Lee Middleton - bass
- Jon Oliva - keyboards
- Bob Kinkel - keyboards
- Jeff Plate - drums
- Mark Wood - strings master
