= The Christmas Attic =

Studio album by Trans-Siberian Orchestra
- Released: September 15, 1998
- Recorded: 1997–1998
- Studio: Soundtrack Studios, Studio 900 and Stellar Productions (overdubs), New York City
- Genre: Symphonic rock, Christmas music
- Length: 73:19
- Label: Lava/Atlantic
- Producer: Paul O'Neill and Robert Kinkel

Trans-Siberian Orchestra chronology
Christmas Eve and Other Stories (1996)	The Christmas Attic (1998)	Beethoven's Last Night (2000)

Singles from The Christmas Attic
- 1. "The World That He Sees" Released: 1998; 2. "Christmas Canon" Released: 2001

Professional ratings
Review scores
Source	Rating
AllMusic	3/5 stars
Collector's Guide to Heavy Metal	8/10

The Christmas Attic is the second studio album by the American rock band Trans-Siberian Orchestra, released in 1998. The cover art is by Edgar Jerins.

On September 5, 2019, The Christmas Attic was certified 2× platinum by the Recording Industry Association of America.

== References to other carols and works ==
- "Boughs of Holly" is a reworking of "Deck the Halls".
- "March of the Kings/Hark! The Herald Angels Sing," besides the obvious carol, is also a rock version of the Farandole from Bizet's L'Arlésienne's Suite No. 2.
- "The Three Kings and I (What Really Happened)" briefly quotes "O Holy Night" and the "Hallelujah" chorus.
- "Christmas Canon" is based on Pachelbel's Canon.
- The "Joy" section of "Joy/Angels We Have Heard on High" is a reworking of Bach's "Jesu, Joy of Man's Desiring."

== Track listing ==
No.	Title	Writer(s)	Length
1.	"The Ghosts of Christmas Eve"	Robert Kinkel; Paul O'Neill	2:15
2.	"Boughs of Holly" (instrumental)	Traditional	4:24
3.	"The World That She Sees"	O'Neill; Jon Oliva	5:59
4.	"Midnight Christmas Eve" (instrumental)	O'Neill; Oliva	4:21
5.	"The March of the Kings / Hark! The Herald Angels Sing" (instrumental)	Georges Bizet; Charles Wesley	3:52
6.	"The Three Kings and I (What Really Happened)"	Kinkel; O'Neill	6:29
7.	"Christmas Canon"	O'Neill; Johann Pachelbel	4:19
8.	"Joy of Man's Desire/Angels We Have Heard on High"	Johann Sebastian Bach; James Chadwick; Kinkel; O'Neill	3:55
9.	"Find Our Way Home"	O'Neill; Oliva	3:45
10.	"Appalachian Snowfall" (instrumental)	Kinkel; O'Neill	4:12
11.	"The Music Box"	O'Neill	3:00
12.	"The Snow Came Down"	Kinkel; O'Neill	5:43
13.	"Christmas in the Air"	O'Neill; Oliva	4:12
14.	"Dream Child (A Christmas Dream)"	O'Neill; Oliva	7:04
15.	"An Angel's Share"	Kinkel; O'Neill	3:05
16.	"Music Box Blues"	O'Neill	5:36

The album was re-released in 2001 with a companion track to "The World That She Sees" (which was shortened from 6 minutes to just 3) called "The World That He Sees" inserted into the track listing directly after "She Sees" and having a length of 4:45. The last track "Music Box Blues" was also truncated to 4:57; this version was previously used in the TSO film The Ghosts of Christmas Eve.

== Personnel ==
=== Performers ===
==== Vocals ====
Solos

- Jody Ashworth
- Joe Cerisano
- Katrina Chester
- Marlene Danielle
- Thomas Farese
- Peggy Harley
- Daryl B. Pediford

Back–Ups

- Latisha Jordan – background coordinator
- Peggy Harley
- Robert Kinkel
- Maurice Lauchner
- Al Pitrelli
- Jon Oliva
- Timara Sanders
- Zak Stevens
- Doug Thoms
- Yolanda Wyns

==== Child choir ====
- Dan Moriarty – conductor

Choir

- The Choristers, St. Bartholomew's Church, New York City
- Marilina Acosta
- Brendan Burgess
- Julia George
- Shoshana Frishberg
- Julian Drabik
- Jack Gibson
- Nina Gottlieb
- Erick Hernandez
- Michelle Repella
- Anton Spivack

==== Orchestra ====
- Robert Kinkel – piano and keyboards
- Jon Oliva – piano, keyboards and bass guitar
- Al Pitrelli – lead, rhythm and bass guitars
- Paul O'Neill, Chris Caffery – rhythm guitars
- Johnny Lee Middleton – bass guitar
- Jeff Plate – drums

=== Production ===
- Paul O'Neill – producer
- Robert Kinkel – co–producer, additional engineering
- Dave Wittman – recording and mixing engineer
- Darren Rapp, Kathy Rich, Robert Duryea, Steve Ship, Tim Ronaghan – assistant engineers
- Joe Johnson, Michael Shielzi, Sheldon Guide – additional engineering
- Gin–Won Lee – additional engineering assistant
- Kevin Hodge – mastering at The Cutting Room, New York

== Charts ==
=== Weekly charts ===
Chart (2014)	Peak position
US Billboard 200	60

Chart (2018)	Peak position
US Top Rock Albums (Billboard)	14

=== Year-end charts ===
Chart (2019)	Position
US Top Rock Albums (Billboard)	82
