= Christmas Eve/Sarajevo 12/24 =

"Christmas Eve (Sarajevo 12/24)"

Single by Savatage / Trans-Siberian Orchestra

from the album Dead Winter Dead and Christmas Eve and Other Stories
- Released: October 1996
- Recorded: 1995
- Genre: Christmas; symphonic metal; progressive metal
- Length: 3:26
- Label: Lava; Atlantic; WEA
- Songwriters: Robert Kinkel; Paul O'Neill; Jon Oliva
- Producer: Paul O'Neill

Savatage singles chronology
"Dead Winter Dead" (1995)	"Christmas Eve (Sarajevo 12/24)" (1995)	"One Child" (1996)

Trans-Siberian Orchestra singles chronology
"Christmas Eve/Sarajevo 12/24" (1996)	"The World That He Sees" (1998)

Music video
- "Christmas Eve/Sarajevo 12/24" on YouTube

"Christmas Eve/Sarajevo 12/24" is an instrumental medley of "God Rest Ye Merry, Gentlemen" and "Carol of the Bells", first released on the Savatage album Dead Winter Dead in 1995 as "Christmas Eve (Sarajevo 12/24)". It was re-released by the Trans-Siberian Orchestra, a side project of several Savatage members, on their 1996 debut album Christmas Eve and Other Stories. The piece describes a lone cello player (based on Vedran Smailović) playing a forgotten Christmas carol in war-torn Sarajevo.

== Composition ==
"Christmas Eve/Sarajevo 12/24" consists of four sections, alternating between soft and loud, as well as between the two component pieces in the medley. Part one consists of "God Rest Ye Merry, Gentlemen" performed on a cello, accompanied only by a picked electric guitar and a flute in round. After a short ritard, part two abruptly begins, with "Shchedryk" (recognizable in the English-speaking world as the melody from "Carol of the Bells") being played at full volume, full orchestration and the synthesizers and electric guitars taking lead melody, with bells joining periodically to play a portion of the melody from "God Rest Ye Merry, Gentlemen". The time signature also abruptly shifts from cut time to a driving triple meter, which persists through the rest of the piece.

After a short transition, the third section consists of a piano solo, featuring motifs from both melodies being played simultaneously, with light string backing that builds through the section. The transition to the fourth and final section is again abrupt; the final section closely resembles the second, with "Shchedryk" being the central melody, again led by guitar and synthesizer with piano added. The coda consists of backing strings continuing softly after the fourth section ends, fading to a close.

Both of the tunes used in "Christmas Eve/Sarajevo 12/24" were in the public domain in 1995: "Shchedryk" was released in 1918 (although the English lyrics to "Carol of the Bells," dating to 1936, were still under copyright and were not included in the recording), while "God Rest Ye Merry, Gentlemen" dated back several centuries. Kinkel, O'Neill and Oliva received copyright protection and songwriting credit through ASCAP for their arrangement.

== Background and writing ==
Paul O'Neill explained the story behind "Christmas Eve/Sarajevo 12/24" in an interview published on ChristianityToday.com:

We heard about this cello player born in Sarajevo many years ago who left when he was fairly young to go on to become a well-respected musician, playing with various symphonies throughout Europe. Many decades later, he returned to Sarajevo as an elderly man—at the height of the Bosnian War, only to find his city in complete ruins.

I think what most broke this man's heart was that the destruction was not done by some outside invader or natural disaster—it was done by his own people. At that time, Serbs were shelling Sarajevo every night. Rather than head for the bomb shelters like his family and neighbors, this man went to the town square, climbed onto a pile of rubble that had once been the fountain, took out his cello, and played Mozart and Beethoven as the city was bombed.

He came every night and began playing Christmas Carols from that same spot. It was just such a powerful image—a white-haired man silhouetted against the cannon fire, playing timeless melodies to both sides of the conflict amid the rubble and devastation of the city he loves. Some time later, a reporter traced him down to ask why he did this insanely stupid thing. The old man said that it was his way of proving that despite all evidence to the contrary, the spirit of humanity was still alive in that place.

The song basically wrapped itself around him. We used some of the oldest Christmas melodies we could find, like "God Rest Ye Merry Gentlemen" and "Carol of the Bells" part of the medley (which is from Ukraine, near that region). The orchestra represents one side, the rock band the other, and single cello represents that single individual, that spark of hope.

The story is a slightly altered version of the real-life story of Vedran Smailović. Despite O'Neill's descriptions of Smailović as "white-haired" and an "old man", he was only 36 years old during his 22-day vigil. Smailović did not actually play any Mozart or Beethoven pieces, but he did play Remo Giazotto's "Adagio in G minor" each day among the bombed ruins of Sarajevo in honor of each person killed in the bombing. He was not the only cellist who played through the siege; the Sarajevo String Quartet, which did have elderly members, were also noted for their continuous performances throughout the siege.

== Chart performance and sales ==
On the week ending January 6, 1996, "Christmas Eve (Sarajevo 12/24)" (with the artist listed as "Savatage") both debuted and peaked at No. 34 on Billboard's Hot Adult Contemporary Track Chart. With the artist name changed to Trans-Siberian Orchestra, the song charted again in the first weeks of January 1997 and January 1998, peaking at No. 49 both times. The song also charted on Billboard's Hot Mainstream Rock Tracks chart on the week ending January 3, 1998, peaking at No. 29.

As of November 25, 2016, total sales of the digital track stand at 1,300,000 downloads according to Nielsen SoundScan, placing it third on the list of all-time best-selling Christmas/holiday digital singles in SoundScan history, falling short only to Mariah Carey's "All I Want for Christmas Is You" and the song "Do You Want to Build a Snowman?" from the movie Frozen.

Chart performance for "Christmas Eve/Sarajevo 12/24"
Chart (2025–2026)	Peak position
Global 200 (Billboard)	126

== Certifications ==
Region	Certification	Certified units/sales
United States (RIAA)	3× Platinum	3,000,000^{‡}
^{‡} Sales+streaming figures based on certification alone.
