= Robert Kinkel =

Bob Kinkel
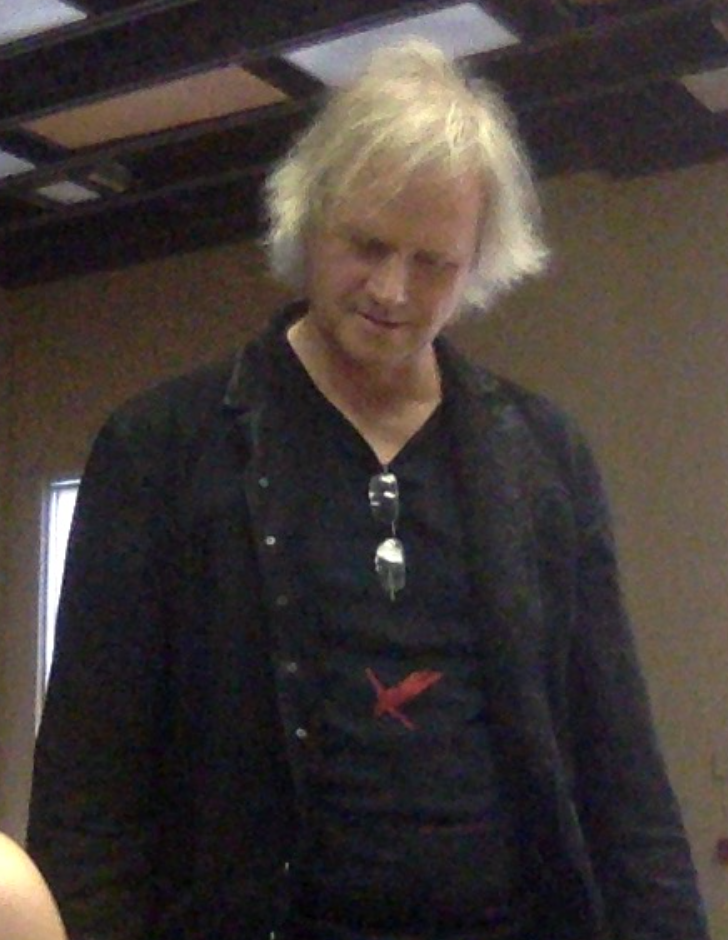
- Kinkel speaking at Villa Maria College in May 2019

Background information
- Born: Buffalo, New York, U.S.
- Genres: Hard rock, heavy metal, progressive metal, symphonic metal
- Occupations: Musician, songwriter, engineer, producer, arranger
- Instrument: Keyboards
- Years active: 1980–present
- Labels: Atlantic

Robert Kinkel is an American professional session keyboardist and music engineer most known for his role as a co-creator/co-producer/co-composer and touring keyboardist with Trans-Siberian Orchestra along with extensive studio work with the progressive metal band Savatage. He attended Hamilton College and graduated with a Bachelor of Arts in music with a minor in physics.

== Life and career ==
Kinkel was born in Buffalo, New York. Receiving his early musical training singing in a choir in his hometown of Williamsville, New York, he continued his education singing in choirs and playing in Williamsville school bands until he attended Hamilton College where he attained his degree in music, studying composition, piano and organ.

His first professional music job came at the Record Plant Studios in New York City, where he assisted on productions for bands such as The Who, Badlands and uncredited work with Aerosmith. Soon afterwards, he began his career as a keyboardist and composed the music for many TV advertising campaigns, including being the producer and voice behind the 1980s "Hefty, Hefty, Hefty – Wimpy, Wimpy, Wimpy" commercial for Hefty trash bags.

He teamed up with producer Paul O'Neill and vocalist-pianist Jon Oliva on Hall of the Mountain King, a 1987 album from Savatage. Kinkel joined Savatage for the follow-up releases Gutter Ballet (1989) and Streets: A Rock Opera (1991), to return again with both keyboard and engineering work on Dead Winter Dead (1995), The Wake of Magellan (1998) and Poets and Madmen (2001). He provided all the keyboard orchestral arrangements while founder Jon Oliva played the standard keyboard parts, but he never performed live with the band. He was also an engineer on Handful of Rain, which featured Testament guitarist Alex Skolnick, and the live album Ghost in the Ruins – A Tribute to Criss Oliva.

With the success of the Savatage holiday song "Christmas Eve (Sarajevo 12/24)" from the 1996 album Dead Winter Dead, Kinkel helped co-create and co-produce Trans-Siberian Orchestra, with O'Neill and Oliva, to reissue the track the next year on the album Christmas Eve and Other Stories. Trans-Siberian Orchestra was the Savatage line-up under a new radio-friendly name with Kinkel given a more active role including co-composer. Savatage produced two more albums before being retired while Trans-Siberian Orchestra became one of the top grossing holiday rock tours. The band would eventually split into two tour groups named 'East' and 'West'. Kinkel was the featured keyboardist and musical director of the East tour. In discussing the unexpected development of the rock opera format, Trans-Siberian Orchestra guitarist Al Pitrelli said in a 2007 interview: “Rock opera is not that popular right now. But about a dozen years or so ago, Paul O'Neill, Bob Kinkel, Jon Oliva and myself just sat down and said, 'We want to make a record that's representative of all four of our musical backgrounds.' It's not like we were trying to write a record that was current, or get on the charts, or keep up with kids 20, 30 years younger than us.”

In 2011, Kinkel began writing, recording, and performing with New York-based vocalist Dina Fanai, who had previously worked as a vocal coach with Trans-Siberian Orchestra.

Kinkel was inducted into the Buffalo Music Hall of Fame in October 2007. The next year, Kinkel commented to Rocknotes Webzine: "It’s just a great honor, to have someone nominate you and then go through the whole thing. That was just a huge honor and it made me feel really good. I was very proud to accept it."

== Discography ==
=== Savatage ===
- Hall of the Mountain King (1987)
- Gutter Ballet (1989)
- Streets: A Rock Opera (1991)
- Ghost in the Ruins – A Tribute to Criss Oliva (1995)
- Dead Winter Dead (1996)
- The Wake of Magellan (1998)
- Poets and Madmen (2001)

=== Trans-Siberian Orchestra ===
- Christmas Eve and Other Stories (1996)
- The Christmas Attic (1998)
- The Ghosts of Christmas Eve (DVD, 2000)
- Beethoven's Last Night (2000)
- The Lost Christmas Eve (2004)
- Night Castle (2009)

=== With others ===
- Was (Not Was) - Born to Laugh at Tornadoes(1983)
- Arthur B. Rubinstein - Wargames Original Motion Picture Soundtrack (1983)
- Smashed Gladys - Social Intercourse (1988)
- Various artists - Fleshtones Present The Big Bang Theory, Time Bomb! with Love Delegation (1988)
- Paul Winter - Wolf Eyes (1988)
- Badlands - Badlands (1989)
- Various artists - Just Say Anything (Vol. V of Just Say Yes) with Royal Crescent Mob (1991)
- Heyday - Heyday (1994)
- Various artists - Reaction, Volume 4 with Thom Jack (1994)

=== Co-compositional credits with Trans-Siberian Orchestra ===
- Appalachian Snowfall
- Beethoven
- Boughs of Holly
- Christmas Dreams
- Christmas Eve/Sarajevo 12/24 (originally by Savatage)
- Dreams of Candlelight
- Faith Noel
- Fur Elise
- Ghosts of Christmas Eve
- Good King Joy
- I'll Keep Your Secrets
- Last Illusion
- Mad Russians Christmas
- Mephistopheles Return
- Midnight
- Misery
- Mozart
- Perfect Christmas Night
- Promises To Keep
- Remember
- Snow Came Down
- Three Kings and I (What Really Happened)
- "Time You Should Be Sleeping"'
- Vienna
- What Child Is This?
- What Good This Deafness
- What Is Eternal
- Whoville Medly
- Wisdom of Snow
- Wizards in Winter
- The World That He Sees
