= Paul O'Neill (producer) =

American composer, musician, and record producer (1956–2017)

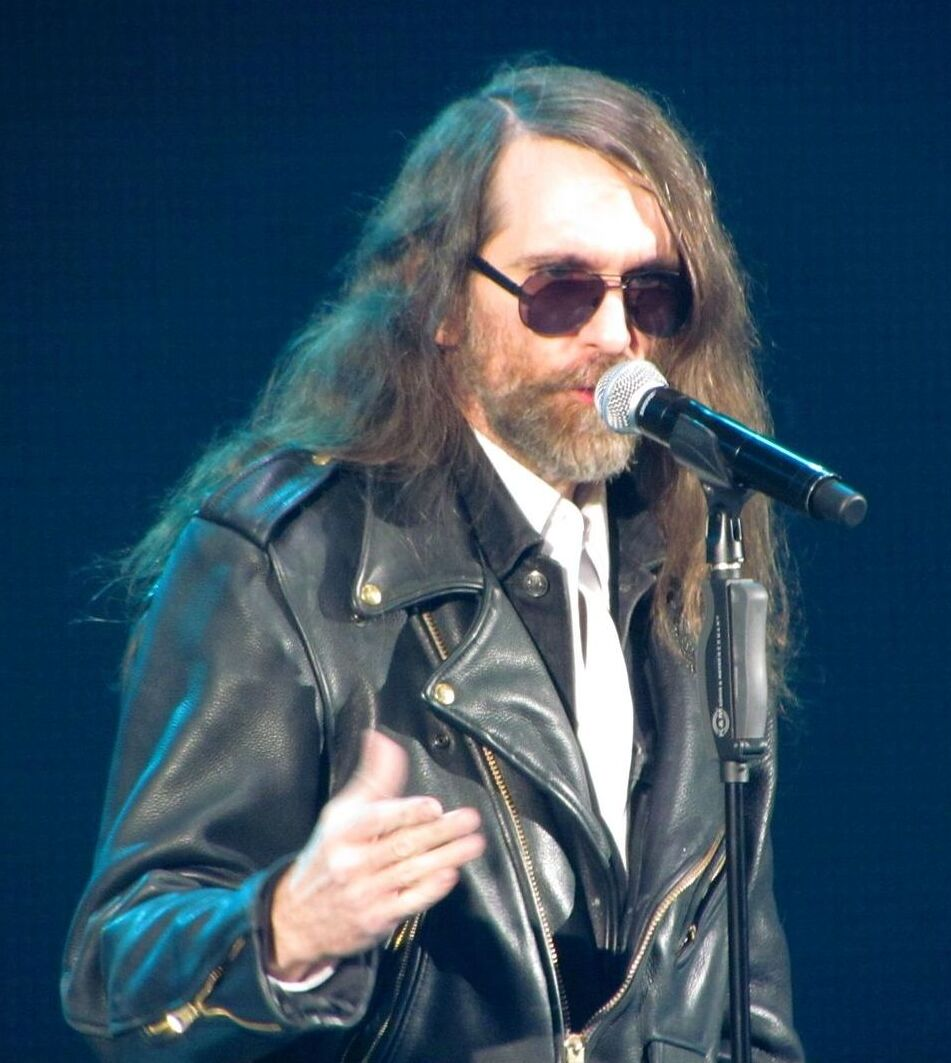
- O'Neill in 2011

Background information
- Born: February 23, 1956; New York City, U.S.
- Died: April 5, 2017 (aged 61) Tampa, Florida, U.S.
- Genres: Rock; rock opera; progressive metal
- Occupations: Composer; lyricist; record producer; audio engineer; musician
- Instrument: Guitar
- Formerly of: Trans-Siberian Orchestra, Savatage, Metal Church, Omen, Badlands, Heaven

Paul O'Neill (February 23, 1956 – April 5, 2017) was an American composer, lyricist, record producer, and guitarist. He was the producer of the progressive metal band Savatage, and the founder of Trans-Siberian Orchestra.

== Career ==
=== Early years ===
Paul O'Neill was born in Flushing, Queens, New York City, the second of his parents' ten children. His music and literary influences, as well as his own artistic visions, were well established before he began working full-time in the industry in his late teens. O'Neill began playing guitar with a number of rock bands in high school and quickly graduated to folk guitar gigs at downtown clubs. He took his first serious musical steps in the mid-1970s when he took his first progressive rock band, Slowburn, into Jimi Hendrix's Electric Lady Studios in New York City. It was there that he first met engineer Dave Wittman who had the ability to capture on tape the sounds O'Neill was hearing in his head. O'Neill ended up shelving the project because he was not happy with final results. He later credited Slowburn's initial failure as one of the luckiest things that could have happened to him, for it gave him the opportunity to learn the recording and concert business from the inside out. Touring with some of the world's biggest bands gave him insight into how the music industry differed from country to country, and a better sense of history, people and finance than books alone could teach.

He landed a position at Leber-Krebs Inc., the management company that launched the careers of Aerosmith, AC/DC, Def Leppard, Ted Nugent, New York Dolls, Scorpions, Joan Jett and others. Specifically, he worked as the personal assistant of manager David Krebs. In the 1980s, O'Neill became a large rock promoter in Japan, promoting every tour of Madonna and Sting in that decade, as well the largest rock festivals in Japan at the time, with such acts as Foreigner, Bon Jovi, Whitesnake, and Ronnie James Dio.

=== Savatage and Trans-Siberian Orchestra ===
Among other bands, O'Neill helmed Aerosmith's Classics Live I and Classics Live II albums before beginning a fortuitous relationship with the band Savatage that led to the iconic albums Hall of the Mountain King, Gutter Ballet, Streets: A Rock Opera, Dead Winter Dead, The Wake of Magellan, and Poets and Madmen. It also introduced him to Jon Oliva, Bob Kinkel and Al Pitrelli, as well as reconnecting him with studio engineer Dave Wittman, who all became original collaborators in O'Neill's next group, Trans-Siberian Orchestra.

"I wanted to take the very best of all the forms of music I grew up on and merge them into a new style," O'Neill said in 2011. "Basically I was building on the work of everybody I worshipped: the rock opera parts from bands like the Who; the marriage of classical and rock from bands like Emerson, Lake & Palmer and Queen; the over-the-top light show from bands like Pink Floyd... I always wanted to do a full rock opera with a full progressive band and at least 24 lead singers.

O'Neill took the idea to Atlantic Records which, to his surprise, went for it and financed the creation of Romanov which was initially to be TSO's first release. "We were very fortunate," he says. "It was one of the only labels left that still did an "old school" kind of artist development." My original concept was; "We were going to do six rock operas, a trilogy about Christmas and maybe one or two regular albums."

However, when Romanov got temporarily put on the back burner, the first installment of the Christmas trilogy, Christmas Eve and Other Stories became TSO's debut album. Fueled by the single "Christmas Eve/Sarajevo 12/24" (originally released on the Savatage concept album Dead Winter Dead) the album went double platinum. More platinum certifications followed with 1998's The Christmas Attic, and the final installment of the Christmas trilogy, The Lost Christmas Eve in 2004. In the midst of completing the trilogy, TSO released their first non-holiday rock opera, Beethoven's Last Night.

== Death ==
O'Neill's body was discovered in an Embassy Suites hotel room in Tampa, Florida. O'Neill's death was announced in a brief note posted on the Trans-Siberian Orchestra website on April 5, 2017, which cited chronic illness. The Hillsborough, Florida medical examiner's office determined the official cause of Paul O'Neill's death as accidental, resulting from an unexpected reaction to prescribed medications to treat his numerous chronic illnesses (including bone augmentation surgery, complications from spinal fusion surgery, heart disease, and hypertension). Found along with O'Neill's body were more than 30 prescription pill bottles in his name.

O'Neill was in the midst of a number of projects, and their continuation was in doubt. On June 24, 2017, TSO announced on their Facebook page that the band would continue the 2017 Winter Tour of "The Ghost of Christmas Eve" in O'Neill's legacy and honor. During the tour, the band (with Kayla Reeves on the east, and Dino Jelusic on the west) honored O'Neill while playing "The Safest Way Into Tomorrow", with images of sunglasses and motorcycle gloves (both trademarks of O'Neill's) projected on the stage's video display.

== Discography ==
=== Aerosmith ===
- 1986 – Classics Live I
- 1987 – Classics Live II

=== Badlands ===
- 1989 – Badlands

=== Omen ===
- 1989 – Escape to Nowhere

=== Heaven ===
- 1985 – Knockin' on Heaven's Door

=== Metal Church ===
- 1993 – Hanging in the Balance

=== Savatage ===
- 1987 – Hall of the Mountain King
- 1989 – Gutter Ballet
- 1991 – Streets: A Rock Opera
- 1993 – Edge of Thorns
- 1994 – Handful of Rain
- 1994 – Japan Live '94
- 1995 – Dead Winter Dead
- 1995 – Ghost in the Ruins – A Tribute to Criss Oliva
- 1997 – The Wake of Magellan
- 2001 – Poets and Madmen

=== Trans-Siberian Orchestra ===
- 1996 – Christmas Eve and Other Stories
- 1998 – The Christmas Attic
- 2000 – Beethoven's Last Night
- 2004 – The Lost Christmas Eve
- 2009 – Night Castle
- 2012 – Beethoven's Last Night – The Complete Narrated Version
- 2012 – Dreams of Fireflies (On a Christmas Night) – EP
- 2015 – Letters from the Labyrinth
