= List of Century Media Records artists =

This page documents current and former artists on Century Media Records, as well as its imprint, Another Century.

== Century Media artists ==
=== Current ===
- 3Teeth
- 77
- Adrenaline Mob
- Allt
- Angelus Apatrida
- Another Day Dawns
- Arch Enemy
- As Everything Unfolds
- Asphyx
- Astroinoid
- At the Gates
- Baest
- Belzebubs
- Beneath the Massacre
- Bewitcher
- Black Crown Initiate
- Bleed From Within
- Blind Channel
- Blood Incantation
- Body Count
- Bonded
- Bombus
- Borknagar
- Broken Hope
- Buckcherry
- Caliban
- Coldrain
- Coroner
- Cryptosis
- Crystal Lake
- Dark Fortress
- Dark Funeral
- Dark Tranquility
- Dead Lord
- Deez Nuts
- Deserted Fear
- Destrange
- Distant
- Electric Callboy
- Enforced
- Entombed A.D.
- Eyehategod
- Feed the Rhino
- Fever 333
- Fight
- Finntroll
- Firespawn
- Folterkammer
- Frozen Soul
- Future Palace
- GosT
- Grave
- Grave Pleasures
- The Haunted
- Havok
- Heaven Shall Burn
- Heriot
- Hideous Divinity
- Humanity's Last Breath
- Ignite
- Imperial Triumphant
- Insomnium
- Jeff Loomis
- Jesus Piece
- Kanonenfieber
- Krisiun
- Lacuna Coil
- Lorna Shore
- Love is Noise
- Marduk
- Mass Worship
- Mayhem
- Mental Cruelty
- Misery Index
- Monsters Scare You
- Monuments
- Moonsorrow
- Morbid
- Morbus Chron
- Napalm Death
- Naglfar
- Nasty
- Necrophobic
- New Years Day
- Night Demon
- Oceans of Slumber
- Of Mice & Men
- The Offering
- Omnium Gatherum
- Orbit Culture
- Orphaned Land
- Orthodox
- Ov Sulfur
- Periphery
- Pinkish Black
- The Pretty Reckless
- Predatory Void
- Queensrÿche
- Radio Moscow
- Sacramentum
- Samurai Pizza Cats
- Sanctuary
- Sanguisugabogg
- Savage Messiah
- Sick of it All
- Signs of the Swarm
- Skeletal Remains
- Slaegt
- Slope
- Sólstafir
- Sonja
- Soulburn
- Spirit Adrift
- Spiritworld
- Stabbing
- Stitched Up Heart
- Suicide Silence
- Swallow the Sun
- Tribulation
- Triptykon
- Turisas
- Unanimated
- Unearth
- Unto Others
- Upon Stone
- Venom Prison
- Vildhjarta
- Vitriol
- Voivod
- Vomit Forth
- Wayfarer
- Wiegedood
- Witchery
- Wilderun
- Witchery
- Witherscape
- Witherfall
- Wolf
- Wolves in the Throne Room

=== Former ===
- 3 Inches of Blood
- 454 Big Block
- 7 Horns 7 Eyes
- Aborted
- Agents of Man
- The Agony Scene
- Alastis
- All Boro Kings
- ...And Oceans
- Andrew W.K.
- Andromeda
- Angel Dust
- Arcturus
- Armageddon
- Architects
- Arsonists Get All the Girls
- Asphyx
- At All Cost
- Avantasia
- Awaken the Empire
- Ayreon
- Becoming the Archetype
- Behemoth
- Beverly Hellfire
- Black Tongue
- Blessed by a Broken Heart
- Blind Guardian
- Blitzkid
- Bloodbath
- Bob Wayne
- Brand New Sin
- Butcher Babies
- Candiria
- Carnal Forge
- Celtic Frost
- Cemetery 1213
- Chaosbreed
- Children of Bodom
- Chum
- Comecon
- Cro-Mags
- Cronian
- Crows
- Cryptopsy
- Daath
- Daemonarch
- Darkane
- Dead to This World
- Death Wolf
- Deicide
- Demolition Hammer
- Despair
- Despised Icon
- Destiny Potato
- Devil City Angels
- Devian
- Devil Sold His Soul
- Diabolical Masquerade
- Diecast
- Dimension Zero
- Dimmu Borgir
- Divine Empire
- DivineFire
- Divine Heresy
- Dragonland
- Dream Evil
- Earth Crisis
- Ebony Tears
- Einherjer
- Embrace The End
- Emperor
- Enchantment
- Enforsaken
- English Dogs
- Enola Gay
- Entwine
- Even Fall
- Evile
- Evocation
- Exodus
- Extol
- Eyes Set To Kill
- Eyes of Eden
- Eyes of Fire
- Fear My Thoughts
- Firewind
- Fireball Ministry
- Flowing Tears
- Fozzy
- Fu Manchu
- The Forsaken
- Gift Giver
- Girl On Fire
- God Forbid
- Gorement
- Gorgoroth
- Graveyard Rodeo
- Grief
- Gurd
- Haste
- Hatesphere
- He Is Legend
- Heart in Hand
- Heart of A Coward
- Helheim
- Hellhammer
- Hexx
- Himsa
- Holy Moses
- Hostility
- House of Spirits
- Iced Earth
- ICS Vortex
- Immolation
- Impaled
- In Flames
- Ingested
- Insidious Disease
- Insult II Injury
- Internal Bleeding
- In This Moment
- Into Eternity
- Into The Flood
- Ion Dissonance
- Intronaut
- Iwrestledabearonce
- Jag Panzer
- Jungle Rot
- Kalmah
- Karyn Crisis' Gospel of the Witches
- Kivimetsän Druidi
- Kotipelto
- Kypck
- Lucifer
- Lions Lions
- Loaded
- Lullacry
- Luna Mortis
- Machine Men
- Manntis
- Mariachi Terror
- Maroon
- Martyr Defiled
- Massacre
- Merauder
- Mercenary
- Moonspell
- Morgoth
- Mucky Pup
- My Own Victim
- My Ruin
- Nachtmystium
- Naglfar
- Nebula
- Nevermore
- Nightrage
- Nightwish
- NJ Bloodline
- Nocturnal Rites
- NonExist
- Norma Jean (Non-U.S./Solid State Records)
- Norther
- Oddland
- OLD
- Old Man's Child
- Only Living Witness
- Opeth
- Opiate for the Masses
- Otherwise
- Paingod
- Paradise Lost
- Passenger
- Pentagram
- Poisonblack
- Poltergeist
- Radakka
- Rise to Remain
- Rotting Christ
- Royal Hunt
- Rumble Militia
- Ryker's
- Sacramentum
- Samael
- Satyricon
- Savage Circus
- Scar Culture
- Sentenced
- Shadow
- Shadows Fall
- Slapshot
- Sleeping Giant
- Sons of Liberty
- Sigh
- Skinlab
- Skyclad
- Soilwork
- Solefald
- Sonata Arctica
- Spineshank
- Stampin' Ground
- Starkill
- Strapping Young Lad
- Street Dogs
- Stick To Your Guns
- Stuck Mojo
- Subzero
- Sundown
- Suffer Well
- Sworn Enemy
- Taake
- Tad Morose
- Tenet
- Terror
- Terrorizer
- TesseracT
- The Agonist
- The Crown
- The Devastated
- The Forsaken
- The Gathering
- The Man-Eating Tree
- The Showdown (Non-US)
- Theatre of Tragedy
- Throne of Chaos
- Tiamat
- Twilight
- Ulver
- Unleashed
- UnSun
- Vallenfyre
- Vampires Everywhere!
- Vasaria
- Vattnet Viskar
- Venomous Concept
- Vital Remains
- Warbringer
- Warmen
- Warrel Dane
- Watch Them Die
- Waylander
- We Were Gentlemen
- Winds of Plague
- Yakuza
- Zimmers Hole
- Zonaria
- Zonata

== Another Century artists ==
=== Current ===
- Aeges
- American Prophet
- IRONTOM
- Lovelytheband
- Radkey
- The Black Moods
- The Fame Riot
- The Haxans
- The Picturebooks
- The Unlikely Candidates
- The Wrecks
- Varsity Week

=== Former ===
- 9ELECTRIC
- Art of Anarchy
- Awaken the Empire
- Fozzy
- Gemini Syndrome
- Like a Storm
- New Years Day
- Otherwise
- Rev Theory
- Righteous Vendetta
- Stitched Up Heart
- Vattica
- XO Stereo
