= Forgetting the Memories =

Swedish metalcore musical group

- Origin: Stockholm, Sweden
- Genres: Metalcore; deathcore
- Years active: 2010–present
- Label: Long Branch Records
- Members: Bastian Kempe; Gustav Holst; Adrian Lyxell; Lukas Olsson; Jacob Hammerstarn
- Website: forgettingthememories.com

Forgetting the Memories is a Swedish metalcore and deathcore band from Stockholm. The current lineup consists of vocalists Bastian Kempe and Lukas Olsson, guitarists Gustav Holst and Adrian Lyxell, and drummer Jacob Hammerstarn.

== History ==
The band was formed in 2010. In 2011, a member named "Joakim" left the band to pursue other ventures. The band released their first album, Monophobia, on the 17th of November, 2016. Three years later, in 2019, they released the EP Known Darkness. In 2021, Forgetting the Memories released the album Vemod, which has been described as a deathcore album. The tracks on Vemod were mixed by Humanity's Last Breath and Vildhjarta member Buster Odeholm.

== Musical style ==
The band has been described as metalcore, deathcore, and melodic death metal.

== Members ==
=== Current line-up ===
- Bastian Kempe – unclean vocals (2010–present)
- Gustav Holst – guitar (2010–present)
- Adrian Lyxell – guitar (2010–present)
- Lukas Olsson – clean vocals (2010–present)
- Jacob Hammerstarn – drums (2010–present)

== Discography ==
=== Studio albums ===
- Monophobia (2016, Self-released)
- Vemod (2021, Long Branch Records)

=== Extended plays ===
- Moments (2011)
- Separate by Time (2015)
- Known Darkness (2019, Long Branch Records)

=== Singles ===
- "A Voice In The Static" (2021, Long Branch Records)
