= Euroblast Festival =

Annual metal festival in Cologne, Germany

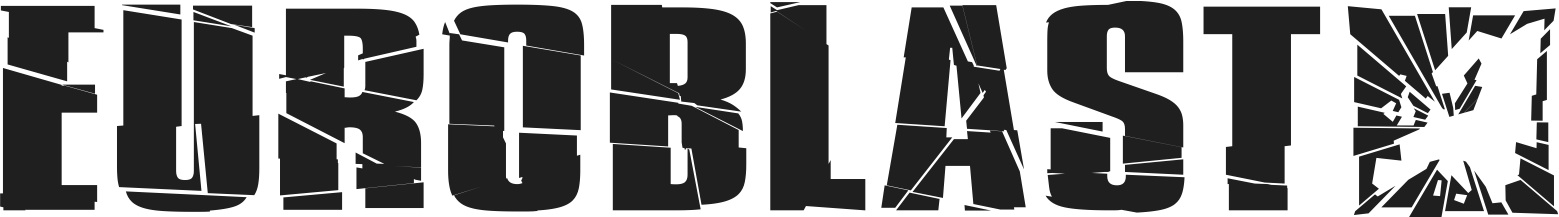
- Genre: Progressive metal, avant-garde metal
- Location: Cologne, Germany
- Years active: 10
- Website: euroblast.net

The Euroblast Festival is an annual music festival held in Cologne, Germany focusing on progressive and avant-garde metal. It was founded in 2008 by long-time friends John Giulio Sprich and Daniel Schneider to create a platform for innovative bands in the modern rock and metal genres. Euroblast has played a significant role in shaping the modern progressive metal scene and has hosted bands and spectators from over 45 countries.

== Background ==
The festival is a key event in the progressive music calendar, with a focus on djent, progressive metal, and experimental music styles. Known for its unique band selection and community-oriented atmosphere, Euroblast has become a major destination for both established and emerging artists in the genre.

== History ==
Near the end of 2007 long-time friends John Giulio Sprich and Daniel Schneider decided that since there had not been a festival of its kind to create their very own platform for innovative bands of the modern rock and metal genres. The two relied on their experience as drummers in various bands when it came to the organization of the first Euroblast Festival. As time passed, a committed team assembled around Sprich and Schneider and they invited an increasing number of bands leading to a wide variety of musical styles performing for the festivals.

For instance, TesseracT, a non-famous and unsigned band at that time, played at the fourth holding of the festival in May 2009; it was their first concert outside Great Britain. Since music labels had started to notice the festival, several bands could sign record contracts in the course of their participation. After the fifth festival in August 2009 it was determined to hold the festival in an annual rhythm from then on. In October 2010 the sixth holding took place in the Underground club in Cologne. When it came to the choice of bands, the organisers for the first time concentrated mainly on the innovative Djent movement, a recent form of progressive Rock and Metal. Since the seventh festival in October 2011, which was the first one to last three day, the promoters have set up a yearly band contest in cooperation with the Internet platform got-djent.com. The winning band is then scheduled to play on the following festival.

The eighth Euroblast was in October 2012 and planned to be four days. The first two were in the Cologne Underground and the other two in the Live Music Hall. After four days, the bands Monuments, Vildhjarta, Jeff Loomis and Stealing Axion also went on a tour through much of Europe organized by the festival promoters. Since its ninth edition in 2013, the festival has been held in the Essigfabrik in Cologne.

=== 2014–2019: Expansion and recognition ===
In 2014 (the 10th edition), Euroblast solidified its reputation by featuring headliners like Animals as Leaders and SikTh. The 2015 edition included Between the Buried and Me and Leprous, showcasing the growing diversity of the festival's lineup. The 15th festival in 2019 featured headliners like Between the Buried and Me, Voyager, and Uneven Structure and introduced newer bands like Azure, Sleep Token, and Votum.

=== 2020–2022: Post-pandemic adaptation and return ===
The 2020 edition of Euroblast was canceled due to the COVID-19 pandemic. In 2021, a one-day event was held on October 2 at Essigfabrik featuring Jinjer, Hypno5e, Space of Variations, and Defocus. Euroblast 2022 marked a triumphant return with the sold out 16th edition from September 30 to October 2. The lineup featured artists like Plini, Vola, Unprocessed, Vildhjarta, and others.

=== 2023–2024: Continued success ===
In 2023, the sold out 17th edition happened from September 29 to October 1 featuring Leprous, The Hirsch Effekt, and GGGOLDDD among others. The 18th edition in 2024 had an eclectic lineup including Northlane, Jakub Zytecki, and Caligula’s Horse. Euroblast Festival's 20th edition will be held at September 25–27, 2026.

== Notable bands and impact ==
Euroblast has hosted iconic bands and artists including Meshuggah, Devin Townsend from the Vancouver metropolitan area in British Columbia and Cynic, while helping launch emerging acts Sleep Token, Humanity's Last Breath, and The Algorithm. The festival's intimate and community-oriented atmosphere has fostered a sense of camaraderie among artists, fans, and industry professionals.

Date	Place	Line-Up
Euroblast Vol. 1 24 May 2008	Bogen 2	Ad Astra, Bardoc, Begging for Incest, By Brutal Force, Debt of Nature, Demise Empire, Deus.Exe, Evidence of Fear, Neraia, Sayn, Thorn, Warfield Within
Euroblast Vol. 2 21 June 2008	Fabrik	A-Rise, Bloodwork, Devilsick, Indicator, Nektra, Skum
Euroblast Vol. 3 24 January 2009	Bogen 2	Abendland, Bloodattack, Damage Source, Decision to Defy, Devine Zero, Dew-Scented, Disörder, Findish Gloom, Lot, Obscura, Worldescape
Euroblast Vol. 4 – French Edition 23 May 2009	Bogen 2	Apron, Dagoba, Deus.Exe, Hacride, Kohatred, Nightshade, Nolentia, Project 13-5, Scorches of Dusk, Sideblast, TesseracT, Textures
Euroblast Vol. 5 – Grind Night 22 August 2009	Bogen 2	Act of Worship, Badoc, Begging for Incest, Centaurus-A, Decree of Hate, Fat Mans War Face, Guerilla, Hordak, Ichor, Jack Slater, Karras, We Butter the Bread with Butter
Euroblast Vol. 6 – Got-Djent Edition 23 October 2010	Bogen 2	Aliases, Chimp Spanner, Divine Temptation, Eryn Non Dae, Monuments, Nightshade, Syranic, Uneven Structure, Vildhjarta
Euroblast Vol. 7 21–22 October 2011	Underground	Afekth, The Algorithm, Aliases, Chimp Spanner, Cruentus, Destiny Potato, Devastating Enemy, Disconcrete, Disperse, Illucinoma, Kryn, Mnemic, Monuments, Panzerballett, Proghma-C, Shattered Skies, Subversion, Sybreed, Syranic, TesseracT, Textures, Uneven Structure, Vildhjarta, Visions, Xerath
Euroblast Vol. 8 – The Sound of Infinity 18–21 October 2012	18.–19.: Underground 20.–21.: Live Music Hall	After the Burial, Agent Fresco, Akeldama, The Algorithm, The Amentia, Animals as Leaders, Bear, Betraeus, C.B. Murdoc, Chimp Spanner, CiLiCe, Circle of Contempt, Destiny Potato, Destrage, Deus.Exe, Eleonore, Exivious, Hacktivist, Halo in Pause, Humanity's Last Breath, In-Quest, The Interbeing, Jeff Loomis, Joncofy, Long Distance Calling, Means End, Modern Day Babylon, Monophonist, Monuments, Neosis, Nexus, Nightshade, No Consequence, Panzerballett, Red Seas Fire, Scar Symmetry, Shattered Skies, Skyharbor, Stealing Axion, Sybreed, TesseracT, Uneven Structure, V3ctors, Vildhjarta, War from a Harlots Mouth
Euroblast Vol. 9 - The Ninth Coming 11- 13 October 2013	Essigfabrik	The Agonist, The Algorithm, Aliases, Arecibo, Bear, Benea Reach, Cambion, Circles, Cyclamen, Dawn Heist, Deathember, Der Weg einer Freiheit, Disperse, Empathea, Ever Forthright, Feared, Fuck You and Die, GrandExit, Hacride, Hans Nieswandt, Heights, Hord, Humanity's Last Breath, Hypno5e, Invocation, Jcut, Kartikeya, Lifeforms, Meshuggah, Monuments, Mors Principium Est, Nexilva, No Consequence, The Ocean, The Omega Experiment, Overdown, Skyharbor, Tardive Dyskinesia, Textures, Third Ear, Threat Signal, Torrential Downpour, Twelve Foot Ninja, The Ulex, Uneven Structure, Vitja, Xerath
Euroblast Vol. 10 - X 2–4 October 2014	Essigfabrik	Agent Fresco, The Algorithm, Animals as Leaders, Astral Display, Ayahuasca, Benevolent, Brutai, Carcer City, Chaosbay, Chimp Spanner, Cosmiterra, Defrakt, Destiny Potato, Dioramic, Drewif Stalin's Musical Endeavors, Driven by Entropy, Exivious, Felix Martin, Fuck You and Die, Galaxy Space Man, Geist, Heart of a Coward, The Heavy Metal Ninjas, Hollow My Eyes, Hypno5e, Inkarna, Kryn, Leprous, The Mars Chronicles, Modern Day Babylon, Monuments, Novelists, Now, Voyager, Ophelias Great Day, Placenta, Red Seas Fire, The Safety Fire, Secret Act, Shattered Skies, SikTh, Suasion, TesseracT, Time Has Come, Under the Pledge of Secrecy, Uneven Structure, Vildhjarta, Voyager
Euroblast Vol. 11 1–3 October 2015	Essigfabrik	Between the Buried and Me, Cynic, Monuments, Leprous, Haken, Soen, The Algorithm, Uneven Structure, Igorrr, The Intersphere, Hypno5se, Devil Sold His Soul, Aeolist, Alaya, Aliases, Atmospheres, Beyond the Dust, Bilo – David Maxim Micic, Cyclamen, Defrakt, Destiny Potato, Destrage, DispersE, Eden Circus, Genuine Aspect, Heavy Metal Ninjas, Juggernaut, Kadinja, Klone, Koroded, Lights of Utopia, Modern Day Babylon, No Consequence, Obsydians, Onward with Love, Persefone, Pigeon Toe, Port Noir, Proghma-C, Pryapisme, Rendezvous Point, Sphere, Stömb, Tardive Dyskinesia, The Hirsch Effekt, The Sun Explodes, Third Ear, Tides from Nebula, Trepalium, Vola
Euroblast Vol. 12 30 September - 2 October 2016	Essigfabrik	A Dark Orbit, Aliases, All Tomorrows, Amber Sea, Anima Tempo, Animals as Leaders, Ayahuasca, Black Crown Initiate, Born of Osiris, Carcer City, Clawerfield, Cold night for alligators, Dead Letter Circus, Deadly Circus Fire, Disperse, Enslaved, Exist immortal, Ghost Iris, Grim van Doom, Heart of a Coward, Hibakusha, Humanity's Last Breath, Intronaut, Invivo, Jinjer, Masuria, Materia, Modern Day Babylon, Ne Obliviscaris, No Consequence, No Sin Evades His Gaze, Novelists, Obsidian Kingdom, Oceans Ate Alaska, Oceans of Slumber, Omega Diatribe, Port Noir, Promethee, Shining, Sithu Aye, Skyharbor, Soon, Strains, The Interbeing, Verderver, Veil of Maya, Vola
Euroblast Vol. 13 29 September - 1 October 2017	Essigfabrik	A Kew's Tag, Andy James, Angel Vivaldi, Atlantis Chronicles, Atlin, Bear, Call The Mothership, Car Bomb, Circut Of Suns, Colone Petrov's Good Judgement, Controversial, Deity's Muse, Devin Townsend Project, Driven By Entropy, Dukatalon, Eschar, Exivious, Frontierer, Galaxy Space Man, Ghost Iris, Harbinger, Hemina, Hieroglyph, Isaac Vacuum, Lo!, Make Me A Donut, Metapshere, Nameless Day Ritual, Neoslave, Riviere, Rémi Gallego (DJ Set), Second Horizon, Sleepmakeswaves, Textures, The Algorithm, The Hirsch Effekt, The Interbeing, The Sleeper, Their Dogs Were Astronauts, Twelve Foot Ninja, Uneven Structure, Voices From The Fuselage, Voyager
Euroblast Vol. 14 5–7 October 2018	Essigfabrik	Adimiron, Aiming For Enrike, Ayahuasca, Cabal, Caligula's Horse, Circles, Conjurer, Copia, Crippled Black Phoenix, Dhark, Heart Of A Coward, Hibakusha, Heptaedium, Humanity's Last Breath, I Built The Sky, Kadinja, Kill Wolfhead, Lake Cisco, Long Distance Calling, Letters From The Colony, Masuria, Monuments, Organized Chaos, Rolo Tomassi, Schiermann, Soen, Sordid Pink, Sümer, Syndemic, Temples On Mars, Terminal Function, The Dali Thundering Concept, The Five Hundred, Theia, Unprocessed, Valis Ablaze, Vildhjarta, Vola, Votum, White Walls
Euroblast Vol. 15 27–29 September 2019	Essigfabrik	22, Svynx, Ghost Iris, Soulsplitter, Azure, Mobius, Siamese, Toundra, Kadinja, Cold Night For Alligators, Sleep Token, Shokran, Sunless Dawn, Odd Palace, Aphyxion, Hypophora, Votum, Anima Tempo, Wheel, Port Noir, VOLA, Frostbitt, The Haarp Machine, Special Providence, Valis Ablaze, Head With Wings, Shrezzers, Between The Buried and Me, The Hirsch Effekt, Thrailkill, Controversial, Wings Denied, Dead Letter Circus, Betraying The Martyrs, Klone, Uneven Structure, Atlas, Kadinja, The Algorithm, Vola, Tides Of Man, Tides From Nebula
Euroblast One Day Event 2 October 2021	Essigfabrik	Jinjer, Hypno5e, Space of Variations and Defocus
Euroblast Vol. 16 30 September - 2 October 2022	Essigfabrik	Aeries, Allt, Azure, Black Tongue, Destrage, Dirty Loops, Edge of Haze, Exploring Birdsong, Four Stroke Baron, Humanity's Last Breath, Karmanjakah, Khroma, Koj, Masuria, Master Boot Record, Nero Di Marte, Nightmarer, Obsidious, Panzerballett, Plini, Telepathy, The Dali Thundering Concept, Time, The Valuator, Unprocessed, Vicera, Vildhjarta, Vola, Volkor X, Voyager, Walzwerk, White Ward.
Euroblast Festival Vol. 17 29 September - 2 October 2023	Essigfabrik	A Kew's Tag, Allt, Artificial Language, Atlas, Bipolar Architecture, Disillusion, Earthside, Einar Solberg, E.N.D., Feather Mountain, GGGOLDDD, Heart of a Coward, Hypno5e, Ice Sealed Eyes, Leprous, Lucrecia, Mankind, Monosphere, Northern Lights, Playgrounded, Primaterra, R3vo, Sextrow, Sheer Cerebral Power, The City Is Ours, The Hirsch Effekt, The Ocean, The Omnific, The Sleeper, This Will Destroy You, Tiberius.
Euroblast Festival Vol. 18 3 - 5 October 2024	Essigfabrik	Anima Tempo, As Living Arrows, Avalanche Effect, Avralize, Ayahuasca, Caligula's Horse, Cauldron, Chaosbay, Consvmer, Defocus, Dies in the Sky, Endgegner, Jakub Zytecki, Kardashev, Kolari, Kyros, Mnemix, Naxen, Northlane, Novelists, Ophelia Sullivan, Ou, Pridian, Something or Other, Svynx, Ten56, Trylion, Unprocessed, Vertex, Vower, Walzwerk, We Are Perspectives.
Euroblast Festival Vol. 19 26 - 28 September 2025	Essigfabrik	Abbie Falls, Baikal, Benthos, Burden to Atlas, Cevret, Distant Dream, Dream State, Dvne, Esoterica, Ihlo, Isbjörg, Necrotted, Night Verses, No Oath, Ron Minis, Royal Sorrow, Second Horizon, Sunborn, TesseracT, The Broken Horizon, The Intersphere, Vianova, Voyager, Walkways.
