= SPV GmbH =

German independent record label

- Parent company: Napalm Records
- Founded: 1984
- Founder: Manfred Schütz
- Distributors: SPV (Germany) (1984–present); Plastic Head Distribution (UK); ADA/MVD/MNRK (North America); Season of Mist/Modulor (France); Suburban Records (Benelux); Musikvertrieb AG (Switzerland); Hoanzl (Austria); Border Music (Nordics); PIAS (Spain); Audioglobe (Italy); Compact (Portugal); Mystic (Eastern Europe); Soyuz Music (Russia); H-Music (Hungary); MGM Distribution (Australia); Diskunion (Japan); The Orchard (Digital Distribution Worldwide)
- Genre: Metal, rock, alternative, pop
- Country of origin: Germany
- Location: Hanover
- Official website: spv.de

SPV GmbH (short for Schallplatten Produktion und Vertrieb GmbH, "Vinyl Production and Distribution Company") is a German independent record label. Founded on 1 January 1984, it has slowly grown to be one of the largest independent distributors and record labels worldwide.

It has several sub-labels that it produces and distributes, including the labels Steamhammer (heavy metal, hard rock), Long Branch Records (Alternative rock, indie, progressive rock, progressive metal, metalcore), Oblivion (darkwave, gothic), SPV Recordings (pop, rock), Cash Machine Records (hip-hop), Select Records (urban), and Synthetic Symphony (industrial).

In November 2020, SPV was acquired by Napalm Records.

== Artists on Steamhammer ==
- Arena
- Angra
- Anne Clark
- Blackmore's Night
- Destruction
- Doro
- Edenbridge
- Evildead
- Eric Burdon
- Hardline
- Helloween
- Iced Earth
- Judas Priest
- Kamelot
- Kreator
- MAGNUM
- Moonspell
- Monster Magnet
- Motörhead
- Pro-Pain
- Prong
- Rhapsody of Fire
- Running Wild
- Saxon
- Sepultura
- Skinny Puppy
- Sodom
- Suzi Quatro
- Type O Negative
- Whitesnake
- Vicious Rumors

== Artists on Long Branch Records ==
- 22 (NO)
- A Pale Horse Named Death (US)
- Agent Fresco (IS)
- Air Drawn Dagger (UK)
- Annisokay (DE)
- As Everything Unfolds (UK)
- Atlas (FI)
- Birth of Joy (NL)
- Black Crown Initiate (US)
- Black Map (US)
- Black Orchid Empire (UK)
- Borders (UK)
- Cabal (DK)
- Callejon (DE)
- Chimaira (US)
- CKY (US)
- Cold Night for Alligators (DK)
- Defences (UK)
- Demons of Ruby Mae (UK)
- Drowning Pool (US)
- Everlast (US)
- Exploring Birdsong (UK)
- Fit for an Autopsy (US)
- Forgetting the Memories (SE)
- Frames (DE)
- From Sorrow to Serenity (UK)
- Ghost Iris (DK)
- Indecent Behavior (DE)
- Ivy Crown (DK)
- John Coffey (NL)
- Jonestown (UK)
- Julia Marcell (PO)
- Kaiser Chiefs (UK)
- Kid Dad (DE)
- KOJ (DE)
- Livingston (UK)
- Luther (DE)
- Madina Lake (US)
- Our Oceans (NL)
- Paradisia (UK)
- PLAIINS (UK)
- Prospective (IT)
- Razz (DE)
- Rendezvous Point (NO)
- Rising Insane (DE)
- S8NT ELEKTRIC (US)
- Second Relation (AT)
- Shields (UK)
- Siamese (DK)
- Silent Screams (UK)
- Silvertomb (US)
- The Five Hundred (UK)
- The Hirsch Effekt (DE)
- The Interbeing (DK)
- The Intersphere (DE)
- The Jury & The Saints (NZ)
- The Low Frequency in Stereo (NO)
- The Royal (NL)
- Throw the Fight (US)
- Tides from Nebula (PL)
- Time, The Valuator (DE)
- Uneven Structure (FR)
- Unprocessed (DE)
- Valis Ablaze (UK)
- Walking Dead on Broadway (UK)
- White Miles (AT)
- Within the Ruins (US)
- Wucan (DE)

== Insolvency ==
The managing partner, Manfred Schütz, decided to submit an application to commence insolvency proceedings on 25 May 2009 – roughly equivalent to Chapter 11 bankruptcy protection in the US and administration in the UK. In response to this, on 27 May 2009, the District Court of Hannover appointed the attorney Manuel Sack as the provisional insolvency administrator. According to Schütz, together with Sack, the management of SPV GmbH would not only carry on business operations, but also continue working in the areas of production and distribution in the usual way.

After a substantial resizing of its business and a partnership venture agreement with Sony Music, which obtained the rights for some of the German label's main artists and for part of the catalogue, SPV went back into production with a new staff at the end of 2009.

== See also ==
- List of record labels
- List of bands distributed by SPV
