= Thousands of Evils =

EP by Vildhjarta
- Released: September 30, 2013
- Recorded: 2012–2013 in Hudiksvall
- Genres: Progressive metal, thall, djent
- Length: 24:10
- Label: Century Media
- Producer: Daniel Bergström

Vildhjarta chronology
Måsstaden (2011)	Thousands of Evils (2013)	Måsstaden under vatten (2021)

Professional ratings
Review scores
Source	Rating
The Circle Pit	9.5/10
Ultimate Guitar	7.3/10

Thousands of Evils is an EP by Swedish progressive metal band Vildhjarta. It was released digitally in Europe on 30 September 2013, and worldwide in digital form and on a limited 1,000 copy 12" vinyl press on 29 October 2013. The EP was made available on Spotify on 3 October 2013. The band released a "forte" version of the EP, as limited gatefold marbled LP (vinyl), limited CD, and digitally on 28 January 2022.

== Background ==
On 13 September 2013, Vildhjarta released a music video of the track 'Dimman' and announced their participation in a North American tour with Veil of Maya, Here Comes the Kraken, Northlane, and Structures. On 1 October 2013, Terrorizer premiered the track 'Regnar Bensin'.

== Critical reception ==
Ultimate Guitar gave the album a 7.5/10, concluding their review by saying "As far as djent goes, Vildhjarta is a pretty interesting group. They do a lot of things right, such as creating very ambient compositions and mixing a lot of "hard" and "soft" sounds so the EP isn't like a non-stop full-on assault from beginning to end. The band shows they aren't afraid to occasionally use clean and acoustic guitars, which really adds a lot of character to their music."

The Circle Pit praised the album, awarding it 9.5/10 and writing that "Thousands of Evils rages and fumes and stomps through a good 20+minute long spiral road in five different directions. The only thing common between the record and its predecessor is the same foreboding in the guitar tones, the same unmerciful chugging riffs- but then again, it’s a “DIFFERENTLY DARK" fable."

Premiering the track 'Regnar Bensin', Terrorizer were positive about the EP as well, writing that "Veering from crushing heavy to eerily calm, ‘Thousands of Evils’ is quite a journey indeed."

== Forte edition ==
A remixed/remastered edition of Thousands of Evils was released on January 28, 2022. The reissue is titled Thousands of Evils (forte), and features revamped/redone drums and bass guitar. Most production and mixing was done by the band's current drummer Buster Odeholm, with assistance from Sworn In drummer Chris George.

== Track listing ==
No.	Title	Length
1.	"Introduction: Staos"	2:39
2.	"Längstmedån (Note: Swedish: "Along The River".)"	3:03
3.	"Dimman (Note: Swedish: "The Fog".)" (Instrumental)	4:07
4.	"Regnar Bensin (Note: Swedish: "Raining Gasoline".)"	2:21
5.	"En mörk vit lögn (Note: Swedish: "A dark white lie".)"	2:11
6.	"Dimman från lützen (Note: Swedish: "The fog from lützen".)"	3:57
7.	"Intermezzo" (Instrumental)	1:52
8.	"Mist förståndet (Note: Swedish: "Loss of mind".)"	4:00
Total length:		24:10

== Personnel ==
Adapted from vinyl liner notes.

=== Vildhjarta ===
- Daniel Ädel – vocals
- Vilhelm Bladin – vocals
- Johan Nyberg – bass
- Daniel Bergström – guitar
- Calle-Magnus Thomér – guitar
- David Lindkvist – drums

=== Additional ===
- Produced by Daniel Bergström
- Mixed and mastered by Christian Svedin
- Artwork by Rickard Westman
- Music written by Daniel Bergström and Calle-Magnus Thomér
- All orchestration written by Patrick Marchente
- All lyrics by Daniel Ädel and Vilhelm Bladin
