= Ashen (album) =

Studio album by Humanity's Last Breath
- Released: August 4, 2023
- Genres: Deathcore; doom metal; djent; thall
- Length: 47:25
- Label: Unique Leader
- Producer: Buster Odeholm

Humanity's Last Breath chronology
Välde (2021)	Ashen (2023)

Singles from Ashen
- 1. "Labyrinthian" Released: 13 May 2023; 2. "Instill" Released: 8 June 2023

Professional ratings
Review scores
Source	Rating
Boolin Tunes	9.5/10
Distorted Sound	9/10
Ghost Cult Magazine	8/10
MetalSucks	10/10
Sputnikmusic	1.5/5
Wall of Sound	9/10

Ashen is the fourth studio album by the Swedish deathcore band Humanity's Last Breath. It was released on 4 August 2023, through Unique Leader Records. A music video for the track "Labyrinthian" was released on 13 May 2023. "Instill" was also released as a pre-release single on 8 June 2023. The track "Linger" gained attention when Norwegian professional golfer Viktor Hovland considered it his favorite song and shared it with other professional golfers such as Rory McIlroy and Jon Rahm.

== Track listing ==
Ashen track listing
No.	Title	Length
1.	"Blood Spilled"	4:58
2.	"Linger"	3:58
3.	"Lifeless, Deathless"	3:57
4.	"Withering"	4:03
5.	"Instill"	4:40
6.	"Labyrinthian"	3:59
7.	"Catastrophize"	4:09
8.	"Death Spiral"	4:23
9.	"Shell"	3:56
10.	"Passage"	4:13
11.	"Burden"	1:24
12.	"Bearer"	3:45
Total length:		47:25

== Personnel ==
- Filip Danielsson – vocals
- Tuomas Kurikka – guitar
- Buster Odeholm – guitar, bass
- Klas Blomgren – drums
