= Måsstaden under vatten =

Studio album by Vildhjarta
- Released: 15 October 2021
- Genre: Progressive metal, djent, groove metal
- Length: 80:08
- Label: Century Media Records
- Producer: Buster Odeholm

Vildhjarta chronology
Thousands of Evils (2013)	Måsstaden under vatten (2021)	Där skogen sjunger under evighetens granar (2025)

Professional ratings
Review scores
Source	Rating
Blabbermouth.net	8.5/10

Måsstaden under vatten (Swedish: "Seagull town underwater") is the second studio album by Swedish progressive metal band Vildhjarta, released on 15 October 2021. It is their first studio release in eight years since the Thousands of Evils EP, and was released nearly ten full years after their debut album, Måsstaden, the concept of which is further explored on this album. Måsstaden under vatten is the group's last album to feature bassist and founding member Johan Nyberg and the first with drummer Buster Odeholm who also produced, mixed and mastered the album.

== Background ==
Vildhjarta had been issuing teasers for the album as far as back in September 2016, when a clip was uploaded to YouTube with the title heartsmear teaser which features a minute of new music in pre-production. No further details of the progress was known afterwards until March 2019, when another teaser clip was uploaded with the title kaos 2 with 90 seconds of music which was released as a single on 15 November 2019. It was the first Vildhjarta song in six years since Thousands of Evils EP which was released in 2013. At that point, the album title was known as kaos 2 with an expected release date of 2020.

Teasing continued throughout the year and more, and on 29 April 2021, the band released a new single "När de du älskar kommer tillbaka från de döda" with an accompanying video, also hinting that the album would be titled Måsstaden under vatten, making a connection to the band's 2011 debut album, måsstaden. On 20 August 2021, two new tracks from the album titled "Toxin" and "Kaos2" were released along with the official announcement of the album. Rickard Westman, who did the artwork for the band's previous two releases, also returns for this album.

"Penny Royal Poison", the final single from the album, was released on 17 September 2021. The record was released October 15.

== Track listing ==
Måsstaden under vatten
No.	Title	Length
1.	"Lavender Haze"	3:23
2.	"När de du älskar kommer tillbaka från de döda (Note: Swedish: "When those you love come back from the dead")"	3:54
3.	"Kaos2"	4:01
4.	"Toxin"	2:56
5.	"Brännmärkt (Note: Swedish: "Branded")"	5:48
6.	"Den helige anden (under vatten) (Note: Swedish: "The holy spirit (underwater)")"	5:27
7.	"Passage Noir"	4:27
8.	"Måsstadens nationalsång (under vatten) (Note: Swedish: "Seagull Town's national anthem (underwater)".)"	5:34
9.	"Heartsmear"	3:24
10.	"Vagabond"	7:18
11.	"Mitt trötta hjarta (Note: Swedish: "My tired heart".)"	3:56
12.	"Detta drömmars sköte en slöja till ormars näste (Note: Swedish: "This womb of dreams is a veil to the nest of snakes".)"	3:06
13.	"Phantom assassin"	2:58
14.	"Sunset Sunrise"	4:44
15.	"Sunset Sunrise Sunset Sunrise"	6:00
16.	"Penny Royal Poison"	3:09
17.	"Paaradiso"	10:03
Total length:		80:08

== Personnel ==
=== Vildhjarta ===
- Vilhelm Bladin – vocals, lyrics
- Daniel Bergström – guitar
- Calle-Magnus Thomér – guitar
- Johan Nyberg – bass
- Buster Odeholm – drums, mixing, production

=== Additional personnel ===
- Rickard Westman – artwork
- Jakob Herrmann – drum recording, drum engineering
