= LIMF =

LIMF may refer to:

- Liverpool International Music Festival
- London International Mime Festival
- Turin Airport, by ICAO airport code

== See also ==
- Lim (f)
