= Returning We Hear the Larks =

Progressive metal solo project

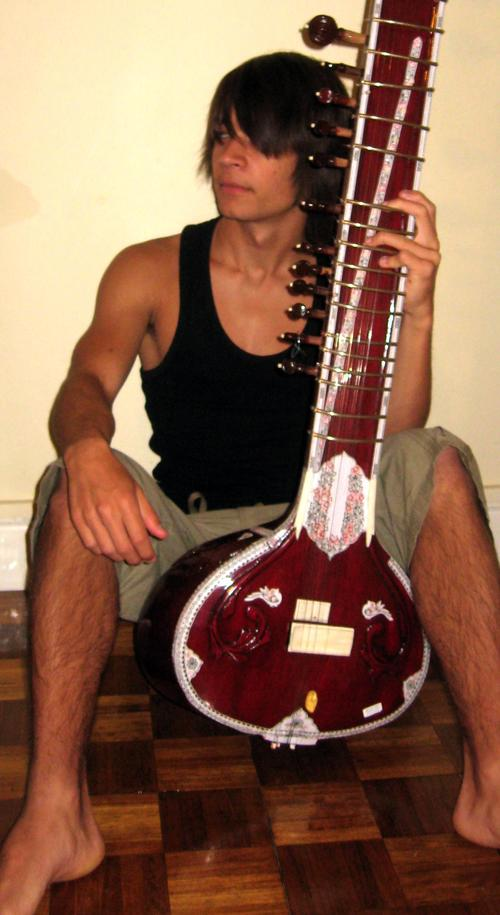

Background information
- Origin: Bristol, United Kingdom
- Genres: Progressive Metal, Djent
- Years active: 2008–2013, 2016–present
- Labels: Murder on the Dancefloor Records (2011–2013); Independent (2006–2011)
- Members: Jack Noble
- Website: Official Bandcamp

Returning We Hear the Larks is the progressive metal solo project of Jack Noble, a student from Bristol, UK. The name is taken from the poem by war poet Isaac Rosenberg.

The project gained attention as part of the early djent scene of the 2010s, as well as through promotion on prominent metal blogs and websites, such as got-djent.com and MetalSucks. Notable American metal magazine Decibel also featured reviews of releases by the project.

Under this name, Noble has released a considerable amount of material, comprising two full-length albums, six extended plays and four compilation albums.

After announcing in 2013 that Far-Stepper/Of Wide Sea would be the final Returning We Hear the Larks album, Noble took to the project's Facebook page in 2016 to reveal that a third album is yet to come.

== History ==
=== Early projects (2004–2008) ===
In 2004, Noble began his musical career writing and recording pop punk music with his younger brother under the name Lentil. He soon began experimenting with his own hard rock music and releasing it online under his own name. A short debut album was released in the spring of 2006 entitled Asphyxiation. In October 2006, he took up rhythm guitar for the local metalcore band Anathematize, consisting of close friends of his. After the band lost various singers, Noble assumed the position of front man as well as second guitarist.

After going through personal troubles in early 2007, Noble relaunched his solo project anonymously under the name MurderOnTheDancefloor (initially written with spaces, until it was changed due to a dispute with the US deathcore band of the same name). Influenced heavily by the music of his teenage years such as Enter Shikari and Bring Me the Horizon, Noble performed a fusion of deathcore and trancecore under this name.

In early 2008, Noble's musical direction changed and he worked on experimental metal/deathcore under the name Sins of the Watchmen for a brief period of time.

=== Initial EPs (2008–2010) ===
Once again in late 2008, Noble chose to take his music in a more experimental direction. Inspired by his visit to Belgium and the battlegrounds of the First World War, the project was named Returning We Hear the Larks. He immediately released the Langemark EP, themed around his experiences in Belgium, and began the development of his debut album. By this time, Noble was heavily influenced by progressive metal bands such as Meshuggah and Gojira. He discovered the beginnings of the djent scene and, with the release of his Of Marduk EP, became one of the first bands on got-djent.com, which has since become an integral part of the djent scene. It was through his presence on this site, as well as on Jamendo, that Noble gained a fanbase amongst the underground/online community.

=== Ypres and Proud England (2010–2011) ===
His increase in listeners generated significant hype for the eventual release of his debut World War One-themed full-length Ypres in summer 2010. The album was released for free digital download on Returning We Hear the Larks' official Bandcamp page. The album has since been distributed to online retailers such as iTunes, Amazon and Spotify by Record Union. The project's final EP, Proud England, was released in March 2011 to critical approval.

Around this time, Noble began the melodic death metal project Red Horizons with his cousin Josh. He also replaced Ash Gollings as the vocalist of UK-based technical death metal band Fractals in the autumn of 2011.

=== Far-Stepper/Of Wide Sea and Larks (2012–present) ===
Three years since the release of his album Ypres, Noble released his second full-length entitled Far-Stepper/Of Wide Sea for free download on his Bandcamp on 25 June 2013. Along with this release, he stated that the project had reached its conclusion and that this would be the last full Returning We Hear the Larks album.

On 30 March 2015, a 'fan favourites' compilation titled Larks was released. The album serves as a greatest hits for the project, spanning 18 tracks of singles, fan favourites and personal favourites of Noble's. All of the tracks on the album were re-mixed and/or re-recorded to the production standard of Far-Stepper/Of Wide Sea.

On 13 January 2016, Noble took to the project's Facebook page to admit that he was unable to "leave Larks dead and buried", and that a third album is yet to come.

== Members ==
- Jack Noble – guitar, bass, drum programming, vocals, sitar, production

== Discography ==
Studio albums

- Ypres (2010)
- Far-Stepper/Of Wide Sea (2013)

EPs

- Langemark (2009)
- Of Marduk (2010)
- Proud England (2011)
- Larks: The Covers (2015)
- Ypres Incarnate (2017)

Compilation albums

- Scattered Fragments of a Past Forgotten: Old Songs Reborn (2010)
- Alpha: The Ypres Months (2010)
- The NewGrounds Years: 2007 – 2010 (2011)
- Larks (2015)

Compilation EPs

- Returning We Hear the Demos, Vol. 1 (2009)
- Returning We Hear the Demos, Vol. 2 (2010)

Singles

- Immolation (2010)
- Line-Trap (2012)
- The Corruption of the Third Sister (2013)
- Thousand-Arms Fortress (2017)
- Lavender Town (Thall Version) (2019)
