= Means End =

Swedish progressive metal band

- Origin: Stockholm, Sweden
- Genres: Progressive metal, experimental metal
- Years active: 2011–2015
- Labels: Independent, Rogue Records America
- Spinoff of: Vildhjarta, Uneven Structure
- Members: Christian Schreil; Rasmus Hemse; Robert Luciani; Leonard Eastgrove; Andreas Grimell

Means End was a Swedish progressive metal band from Stockholm whose sound is spearheaded by SATB choirs, operatic vocals, eight-string guitars, and jazz-fusion compositions. Their music is likened to an amalgamation of artists such as Eric Whitacre, Devin Townsend, Meshuggah, and Yellowjackets. They are notable for bridging the gap between classical composition and contemporary instrumentalism.

== History ==
Means End was formed in late 2011 by bassist Rasmus Hemse and drummer Christian Schreil (previous member of Uneven Structure). They were later joined by acclaimed vocalist and Microsoft guru Robert Luciani (previous member of Vildhjarta) and fusion guitarist Leonard Eastgrove. Within a couple of months, Means End released an extended play with three songs to present their particular style and began composing a full-length album.

In 2012, the band earned endorsements with Toontrack, Fractal Audio, Lundgren Pickups, Microsoft, and partnered with Grammy Winning composer Eric Whitacre to remake his choir composition "Nox Aurumque" into a linear tempo metal song. Means End also performed at Vol.8 of the renowned Euroblast Festival with excellent feedback and an appreciated performance. After a year of focused composition and collaboration, Means End self-released their 12- debut album, The Didact. The album would earn Means End their first record deal.

In 2013, Means End signed a publishing and distribution deal with Rogue Records America for their next album, as well as for the re-release of their debut album The Didact in physical and digital formats. Means End said this in reaction to their new relationship with Rogue, "Of all the reputable companies we’ve approached, Rogue is the only one not afraid to their chin out. They bet on up-and-coming bands, invent modern and clever distribution and marketing strategies, work with alternative media channels like video-game publishers, and lots of other things that the ageing plus-size labels simply can’t match. More importantly though, our strategic partnership with Rogue will result in more and better music than ever before. We’re looking forward to drawing on all of Rogue’s creative talent." The band began writing material for their next album set to be released sometime in 2015. On 29 April 2014 a new guitarist, Andreas Grimell, was introduced in an instrumental, dual-guitar, playthrough of their song Omega Barrier.

The band announced their disbandment on 8 March 2015.

== Musical Style and Lyrical Themes ==
=== Musical Style and Genre Traits ===
Means End's musical style would be commonly classified as progressive metal or fusion. Unique components include heavy use of non-diatonic key-changes, polyphonic counterpoint, chromatic scales, and true polyrhythm. The guitar style uses a guitar tone popularly known as djent, popularized by extreme metal band Meshuggah. Full SATB choirs are used in the foreground of their music rather than as an atmospheric pad. Vocals are dynamic, ranging from low death metal growls to soaring operatic vocals. Walking-bass lines are influenced by jazz fusion.

=== Lyrical Themes ===
Means End's lyrics touch on many philosophical topics. The lyrics consists of philosophical themes such as ontology, epistemology, history of ideas, metaphysics, mathematics, and other things that interest them. More specifically, a song called Omega Barrier is related to computer science, but also crosses the barrier to both philosophy and mathematics. An example from Omega Barrier is:

"This fits well with the observation that we simply can’t force ourselves to describe the neural or even symbolic functions from whence something like ambition emerges from; it’s just there.
We could very well just be machines underneath it all and never be the wiser."

Many of their other songs feature complex, open-ended, lyrics, just as Omega Barrier does.

== Studio Recording Equipment ==
Robert Luciani uses Neumann and Shure Microphones into a TwinFinity tube preamp to record vocals. Rasmus Hemsel uses a tube-preamp to record on his bass which as a custom made Lundgren pickup. Leonard Östlund uses a 30" 8-string VP Guitar with a custom made Lundgren pickup. An -Fx II, an all-in-one preamp and effects processor, is used on both of Rasmus and Leonard's equipment to boost sound quality. Drums are programmed with -samples used in ToonTrack's Metal Foundry.

== Discography ==
Extended Plays

- EP (2011) (re-release 2012)

Studio Albums

- The Didact (2013)

== Members ==
Final line-up

- Robert Luciani – vocals (2011–2015) (ex-Vildhjarta)
- Rasmus Hemse – bass (2011–2015)
- Christian Schreil – drums (2011–2015) (ex-Uneven Structure)
- Leonard Eastgrove – guitar (2011–2015)
- Andreas Grimell – guitar (2014–2015)

Former

- Henrik Gennert – guitar (2012)
