= Thrown (band) =

Swedish metalcore band

- Origin: Stockholm, Sweden
- Genres: Nu metalcore; metalcore; nu metal
- Years active: 2019–present
- Label: Arising Empire
- Members: Marcus Lundqvist; Johan Liljeblad; Andreas Malm; Buster Odeholm
- Website: extendedpain.com

Thrown (stylized in lowercase or uppercase) is a Swedish nu metalcore band formed in 2019, and are signed to Arising Empire. The group consists of vocalist Marcus Lundqvist, guitarists Johan Liljeblad and Andreas Malm, and drummer/producer Buster Odeholm (Humanity's Last Breath and Vildhjarta).

The band released their debut album, Excessive Guilt (stylized in uppercase), in August 2024, consisting of 11 songs in a total length of just over 20 minutes.

== History ==
In 2019, vocalist Marcus Lundqvist and guitarist Andreas Malm had an idea to try new things and create more of a modern metal band when compared to their previous band, and contacted Buster Odeholm, the drummer for Vildhjärta and multi-instrumentalist for Humanity's Last Breath. Marcus and Andreas originally wanted Buster to be their producer, but became their drummer as well. Finally, they asked Johan Liljeblad, a stand-in guitarist for Marcus and Andreas's previous band, if he wanted to join in, and Johan accepted. During quarantine, the band spent a lot of their time writing songs for Thrown.

In 2022, the band released their debut EP, Extended Pain, including the three singles prior, and went on tour with Counterparts. While releasing songs, the band also toured with Invent Animate and Fit for a King in 2023, and are touring with Spite, Alpha Wolf, and While She Sleeps in 2024. Alongside these tours, they've also supported Knocked Loose, Architects, and August Burns Red, but only for a few shows rather than a whole tour. On 30 August, the band released their debut studio album, titled Excessive Guilt.

On 23 September 2026, the band announced their next studio album, titled Unwanted, to be released on 6 November.

== Musical style ==
Thrown's style has been described as nu metalcore, hardcore, metalcore, and nu metal.

Thrown's style has also been associated with the label "pissed-core", a subgenre of nu metalcore. According to Brothers In RAW, Thrown are often called the "poster boys for pissed core". In a 2024 interview with Metal Hammer the band rejected the term, stating "I'm not sure it's that accurate, to be honest. I'm not going to pretend that we aren't super-pissed off about a lot of stuff... but so are a lot of other genres."

== Members ==
Current

- Marcus Lundqvist – vocals (2019–present)
- Johan Liljeblad – guitar (2019–present)
- Andreas Malm – guitar (2019–present)
- Buster Odeholm – drums (2019–present), bass (2019–present; studio)

Touring

- Markus Matz – drums (2021–present)

== Discography ==
=== Studio albums ===
List of studio albums, with selected details
Title	Album details
Excessive Guilt	Released: 30 August 2024; Label: Arising Empire
Unwanted	Released: 6 November 2026; Label: Arising Empire

=== EPs ===
List of extended plays
Title	EP details
Extended Pain	Released: 23 March 2022; Label: Arising Empire

=== Singles ===
- "Grayout" (2021)
- "Fast Forward" (2021)
- "New Low" (2022)
- "Guilt" (2023)
- "On the Verge" (2023)
- "Backfire" (2024)
- "Nights" (2024)
- "Look at Me" (2024)
- "Split" (2026)
- "Rehearsed" (2026)
- "Critic" (2026)
- "Unwanted" (2026)

=== Music videos ===
List of music videos, showing year released, album and director(s)
Title	Year	Album	Director(s)	Link
"Grayout"	2021	Extended Pain	Lucas Englund	
"Fast Forward"	2021	Extended Pain	Lucas Englund	
"Parasite"	2022	Extended Pain	John Gyllhamn	
"Guilt"	2023	Excessive Guilt	Tre Film	
"On the Verge"	2023	Excessive Guilt	Tre Film	
"Backfire"	2024	Excessive Guilt	John Gyllhamn	
"Nights"	2024	Excessive Guilt	Riivata Visuals & Grim Visions	
"Split"	2026	Unwanted	Midvessel	
"Rehearsed"	2026	Unwanted	Pavel Trebukhin	
"Critic"	2026	Unwanted	Midvessel	

== Festivals ==
Year	Festival / Event	Location	Country	Ref.
2023	Core Fest	Stuttgart	Germany	
2024	Impericon Festivals	Multiple cities	Germany, Austria, Switzerland	
2024	Welcome To Rockville	Daytona, FL	USA	
2024	Sonic Temple	Columbus, OH	USA	
2024	Nummirock	Nummijärvi	Finland	
2024	Hellfest	Clisson	France	
2024	Jera On Air	Ysselsteyn	Netherlands	
2024	Vainstream Rockfest	Münster	Germany	
2024	Mighty Sounds	Tábor	Czech Republic	
2024	Radar Festival	Manchester	United Kingdom	
2024	Reload Festival	Sulingen	Germany	
2024	Rock The Lakes	Vallamand	Switzerland	
2024	Music Forge	Münzenberg	Germany	
2024	Fallen Fortress Open Air	Bad Dürkheim	Germany	
2025	Rock Im Park	Nuremberg	Germany	
2025	Rock Am Ring	Nürburgring	Germany	
2025	Broken Summer	Stockholm	Sweden	
2025	Tuska Open Air	Helsinki	Finland	
2025	Szene Open Air	Lustenau	Austria	
2025	Full Rewind Festival	Löbnitz	Germany	
2025	Brutal Assault	Járomer	Czech Republic	
2025	Alcatraz Festival	Kortrijk	Belgium	
2025	Bloodstock Open Air	Derby	United Kingdom	
2025	Summer Breeze Open Air	Dinkelsbühl	Germany	
2025	Rock The Lakes	Cudrefin	Switzerland	
2025	Dynamo Metalfest	Eindhoven	Netherlands	
2025	Motocultor Festival	Pays de Vannes	France	
2025	Louder Than Life	Louisville, KY	USA	
2025	Riot Fest	Chicago, IL	USA	
2025	Aftershock Festival	Sacramento, CA	USA	
2026	Welcome To Rockville	Daytona, FL	USA	
2026	Sonic Temple	Columbus, OH	USA	
2026	Mystic Festival	Gdansk	Poland	
2026	Sweden Rock Festival	Sölvesborg	Sweden	
2026	Rock For People	Hradec Kralove	Czech Republic	
2026	Greenfield Festival	Interlaken	Switzerland	
2026	Nova Rock Festival	Nickelsdorf	Austria	
2026	Download Festival	Donington	United Kingdom	
2026	Graspop Metal Meeting	Dessel	Belgium	
2026	Low-L Festival	Piacenza	Italy	
2026	Copenhell	Copenhagen	Denmark	
2026	Impericon Festival	Leipzig	Germany	
2026	Jera On Air	Ysselsteyn	Netherlands	
2026	Vainstream Rockfest	Münster	Germany	
2026	Resurrection Fest	Viveiro	Spain	
2026	RIIP Fest	Notre Dame D'Oé	France	
2026	Wacken Open Air	Wacken	Germany	
2026	Reload Festival	Sulingen	Germany	
2026	Göteborg Brinner	Gothenburg	Sweden	
2026	Furnace Fest	Birmingham, AL	USA	
2026	Core Fest	Göppingen	Germany	

== Awards and nominations ==
Year	Award	Category	Result
2024	Heavy Music Awards	Best Breakthrough Live Artist	Won
2024	Heavy Music Awards	Best International Breakthrough Artist	Nominated
2025	Heavy Music Awards	Best Breakthrough Album	Won
