= Thal =

Thal may refer to:

== Places ==
- Thal, Lower Austria, Austria
- Thal, Styria, Austria
- Thal, Ruhla, Germany
- Thal, Uttarakhand, Didihat district, India
- Thall, Hangu District, Khyber Pakhtunkhwa (also spelled Thal), Pakistan
  - Thal railway station
- Thal, Upper Dir District, Khyber Pakhtunkhwa (also spelled Thall), Pakistan
- Thal, St. Gallen, Switzerland
- Thal District, Solothurn, Switzerland
  - Thal Nature Park, Switzerland
- Thal Desert, Punjab, Pakistan
- Thal Thikana, Rajasthan, Ajmer district, India

== People ==
- Eric Thal (born 1965), American film and stage actor
- Johannes Thal (1542–1583), German physician and botanist
- Thal Abergel (born 1982), French chess Grandmaster

== Other uses ==
- Thal (Doctor Who), a fictional alien race

== See also ==
- Thali (disambiguation)
- Thall (disambiguation)
- Thar (disambiguation) or thal, generic term for deserts in Indic languages
- Ḏāl, an Arabic letter ذ
- Thal Brigade, an Infantry formation of the Indian Army during World War II
