= Far-Stepper/Of Wide Sea =

Studio album by Returning We Hear the Larks
- Released: 25 June 2013
- Genre: Djent
- Length: 47:32
- Label: Murder on the Dancefloor Records
- Producer: Jack Noble

Returning We Hear the Larks chronology
Proud England (2011)	Far-Stepper/Of Wide Sea (2013)	Larks (2015)

Singles from Far-Stepper/Of Wide Sea
- 1. "The Corruption of the Third Sister" Released: 11 June 2013

Far-Stepper/Of Wide Sea is the second studio album by British progressive metal artist Returning We Hear the Larks. It was released on 25 June 2013 through Murder on the Dancefloor Records. The album was produced by the project's sole member Jack Noble.

Far-Stepper/Of Wide Sea is a concept album, narrating a modified version of the story of the Gorgon sisters of Greek mythology. The narrative portrays the Gorgons as innocent and misunderstood creatures, eventually turned vengeful after being hunted and abused by the Greek gods.

The album's title is a loose translation of 'Euryale', the narrative's primary focus. Varying translations of the name exist, including "far-roaming", "wide-leaping", "the far-springer, or of the wide sea" and "she of the wide briny sea".

== Background ==
Though the date varies depending on source, recording and composition is stated to have begun as early as 2007 in the album's liner notes, long before the release of Returning We Hear the Larks' first album Ypres. Noble has explained this as his composition method:

I write my music by recording sections as and when I come up with the parts. This culminates in tracks that were recorded over a number of years, and sections of this album were recorded as far back as 2009.

— Jack Noble, RateYourMusic

The bulk of the recording and mixing process occurred between 2011 and 2013, between Noble's family home in Bristol, England, and his university house in Bath, England. The album's liner notes state that the composition and recording of the thirteen-minute climax "A Dæmon Hunted/The Flight of Perseus" took a year to complete.

In the release announcement on 25 June 2013, Noble stated that Far-Stepper/Of Wide Sea would be the last Returning We Hear the Larks album. Three years later on 13 January 2016, Noble took to the project's Facebook page to admit that he was unable to "leave Larks dead and buried", and that a third album is yet to come.

== Narrative ==
The album's concept tells the story of the three Gorgon sisters of Greek mythology. They are described as beautiful and gentle creatures, as opposed to the traditional depiction of the Gorgons as grotesque and evil. The album artwork designed by Noble shows Medusa with a feminine build, blue-grey skin and dark grey hair.hough the plot generally follows that of the Gorgons in ancient Greek mythology, some aspects, such as the deep emotional connection between the sisters, were conceived by Noble.

=== Act 1: Prologue ===
The prologue is told primarily in third person, but features sections from the perspective of Stheno, the oldest of the three Gorgons.

Immortal sisters Stheno and Euryale have lived alone for a thousand years in the sea caves below Mount Olympus before their peace is shattered by the arrival of Zeus. As a challenge from the gods, Zeus hunts and kills Stheno in front of her sister before fleeing the island with the Gorgon's severed head.

Seeing her only love die leaves Euryale distraught, and she spends the next thousand years mourning the loss of her sister, while taking revenge on man by luring and eating them.

=== Act 2 ===
The second act is told primarily in third person, but features sections from the perspectives of Euryale, Medusa and Poseidon.

After centuries alone below Mount Olympus, Euryale witnesses her deity parents Phorcys and Ceto return to the caverns to hide their shameful lovemaking. After they depart the island, Euryale hears a cry from within and discovers the mortal baby Medusa. Euryale devotes herself to her young sister and becomes a mother figure, bringing purpose back to her life.

In her teenage years, Medusa learns of Stheno's murder from Euryale. Furious at the gods, Medusa decides to ascend Mount Olympus to get her revenge, without Euryale's knowledge. Upon arrival at the Temple of Athena, Medusa is met by Poseidon, who proceeds to overcome and subsequently rape her. Athena witnesses the act and curses Medusa, causing all mortals to turn to stone upon gazing at the Gorgon. Medusa returns to the caverns below, traumatised by the horrors that have befallen her.

In the years that follow, Medusa stares out to sea, desperate for love and companionship to heal her emotional damage. Her sister Euryale falls deeply in love with the girl, longing to be the one who could bring Medusa solace. Eventually, Euryale reveals her feelings and Medusa discovers the comfort she craved with her sister. Their love blossoms, but is cut tragically short by another arrival on the island.

The warrior Perseus comes ashore, fuelled by the dark stories told of the sisters and intent on slaying them. He has been tasked with beheading the young Medusa, and is equipped with a reflection shield, to avoid the girl's deadly gaze. Wasting no time, Perseus attacks the Gorgons and Euryale fights with all she can muster to defend her sister, but is ultimately beaten and wounded by the warrior. Medusa manages more of a fight, but is ultimately killed by Perseus, who tears her eyes from her head before lifting her by the hair and separating the head from her body.

As Perseus turns to flee the island, Euryales utter despair and rage fuel her to give chase, desperate to slay and eat the man who had killed her only love. With the speed of gods at his heel however, Perseus succeeds in outrunning the Gorgon and takes his leave, never to be seen again.

Euryale is left broken and alone once again, doomed to live an immortal existence of hatred and despair in the caverns of Mount Olympus.

== Track listing ==
No.	Title	Length
1.	"Prologue: Stheno; Slain by Hand of Gods"	9:14
2.	"Nascence in the Caverns of Mount Olympus"	6:33
3.	"The Corruption of the Third Sister"	9:04
4.	"The Despairing Sea I: In Search of Solace"	4:24
5.	"A Dæmon Hunted/The Flight Of Perseus"	13:23
6.	"The Despairing Sea II: The Wanderer Euryale"	4:54
Total length:		47:32
