= Love at Last =

American heavy metal band

- Genres: Heavy metal; progressive metal
- Years active: 2011–present
- Label: Hollowed Records

Love at Last is an American heavy progressive metal band from Tampa, Florida, founded as Akeldama in 2011 by vocalist, songwriter, and producer Andrew Zink. After releasing their debut EP and full-length studio album, the band changed their name in March 2017 which also marked the group's new line-up. Their second full-length album is planned for release in 2019 on Hollowed Records.

== History ==
=== 2011–2013: Formation and EP ===
Akeldama formed as a six-piece heavy progressive metal band in Tampa, Florida in mid-2011 by vocalist, guitarist, songwriter, and producer Andrew Zink. After he left his previous group, Zink began to write and record songs on his own and released them on-line which drew some attention. He then recruited several musician friends to learn the material with the prospect of having it performed live. They settled on Akeldama as their name, based on an alias Zink had used on various online forums and video games accounts.

On March 28, 2011, Akeldama released their three-track self-titled EP as a free download. It was recorded in Zink's home facility, Zink Audio, and he is credited as the sole producer, mixer, and prominent songwriter, with the other members adding their own sections to Zink's ideas. In October 2012, Akeldama performed a set at the eighth edition of the heavy metal Euroblast Festival in Cologne, Germany. Zink and Reibling had asked its founder, John Sprich, if the band could perform at the event, to which Sprich agreed on the condition that they fund their trip to Cologne and perform without any promotion. Soon after, Sprich met the band in Florida during a family visit and attended a late night rehearsal. Schweitzer recalled: "He was really humbling because we thought, at the time, that we were doing everything right ... and he just put us down on our asses and told us that we were doing everything wrong". Upon Sprich's suggestion of having the band release a music video online, one was made to "Motionless; Emotionless" using an iPhone. Akeldama followed their Euroblast set with a small scale European tour supporting Scar Symmetry.

=== 2013–present: Everything Beautiful and upcoming album ===
Akeldama's first full-length studio album, Everything Beautiful, was released independently without a record signing on September 6, 2013. It is a concept album based on what Zink described as "two souls who are tied together for eternity through love", and features Skyharbor guitarist, Keshav Dhar, vocalist Ashe O'Hara formerly of TesseracT, and Scar Symmetry guitarist Per Nilsson. The title track was released as its lead single, a song that Zink said "sets the stage for everything". It was a critical success, with the album entering the top albums list on metal websites GotDjent and Mind Equals Blown. In June 2014, Akeldama secured a two album distribution deal with the independent label Rogue Records America. To commemorate the signing, the Akeldama EP was remastered and made available as a free digital download. In addition, the band became a part of Project Rogue, a collaborative video project involving members of various rock and metal bands.

On 20 March 2017, the group announced the end to Akeldama and their new name, Love at Last. The news coincided with the departure of guitarist and vocalist, Jeremy Knapp, after his decision to become a fire fighter, so Reibling became the guitarist and Zink the band's now sole vocalist. Following a recording deal with the independent label Hollowed Records, their second full-length studio album was planned for release in 2018. In a video posted on the band's Facebook page in October 2017, Owen revealed an upcoming lead single, and described the musical direction of Love at Last as similar to Akeldama with less emphasis on Reibling's harsh vocals and greater use of Zink's higher pitched singing. Owen said the band's name is meant to reflect the musical style and themes addressed in the songs, including positivity and a "love conquers all" feel. The new album was originally to be a double concept album, but the idea changed into a single album without an overall theme. A 2019 release was scheduled.

== Discography ==
=== EPs ===
- Akeldama (2011)

=== Studio albums ===
- Everything Beautiful (2013)
- TBA (2019)

== Band members ==
=== Current members ===
Source.

- Andrew Zink – lead vocals, production
- Connor Reibling – guitar (March 2017–present), vocals (until 2017)
- Eric Owen – guitar
- Michael Schweitzer – bass
- Evan Thibeault – drums, percussion

=== Former members ===
- Jeremy Knapp – guitar (until March 2017)
