= List of bands distributed by SPV =

A list of bands distributed by SPV GmbH records either on house labels or through distribution deals.

== A ==
- Ace Frehley
- Adaro
- Albert Hammond
- Al Di Meola
- The Amorettes
- Amplifier
- Angra
- Annihilator
- Arena
- Atrocity
- Axel Rudi Pell
- Ayreon

== B ==
- Bad Religion
- Beyond Fear
- Biohazard
- Blackfield
- Blackmore's Night
- B L A Z E
- Böhse Onkelz
- Borknagar
- Brainstorm
- Brazen Abbot
- Bullet
- Bush (Europe)

== C ==
- Calvin Russell (musician)
- Chandeen
- Chassalla
- Chris de Burgh
- Chris Farlowe
- Chris Spedding
- ChthoniC
- Company of Snakes
- Covenant
- Cradle of Filth

== D ==
- Demons and Wizards
- Die Verbannten Kinder Evas
- Doro
- Dreadful Shadows
- Dry Kill Logic

== E ==
- Edenbridge
- Enslaved
- Eric Burdon
- Evergrey
- Evildead

== F ==
- Fields of the Nephilim
- Freedom Call

== G ==
- Gamma Ray
- Glyder (band)
- Grip Inc.

== H ==
- Hammercult
- Nina Hagen
- Hatesphere
- Helloween
- Hirax

== I ==
- Iced Earth
- Illnath

== J ==
- Jag Panzer

== K ==
- Kamelot
- Kill Devil Hill
- Kreator

== L ==
- Lucyfire

== M ==
- Mad Max
- Magnum
- Metal Church
- Monster Magnet
- Moonspell
- Motörhead
- Michael Schenker
- Michael Schenker Group
- Mucky Pup

== O ==
- The Other

== P ==
- Popol Vuh
- Pro-Pain

== Q ==
- The Quireboys

== R ==
- Rhapsody of Fire
- Ravens Creed

== S ==
- Saga
- Sara Noxx
- Saxon
- Sepultura
- Shadowkeep
- Skinny Puppy
- Sodom
- Stream of Passion
- Summoning
- Solar Fake

== T ==
- Theatres des Vampires
- Tokyo Blade
- Tristania
- Type O Negative

== U ==
- Unleashed

== V ==
- Vardis
- Vintersorg
- Virgin Steele
- Vicious Rumors

== W ==
- Whitesnake

== Z ==
- Zebrahead
