= Buster Odeholm =

Swedish musical artist

- Born: Buster Douglas Odeholm; January 7, 1992 (age 34); Glumslöv, Sweden
- Occupations: Musician, producer, audio engineer
- Instruments: Drums, guitar, bass, programming
- Years active: 2009–present
- Website: odeholm-audio.com

Buster Douglas Odeholm (born 7 January 1992) is a Swedish musician, producer, and audio engineer. He is best known as a guitarist, producer, and primary songwriter for Humanity's Last Breath and as the drummer for Vildhjarta. Odeholm is widely regarded as an influential figure in the development of modern extreme metal production.

== Early life ==
Odeholm was born in Glumslöv, Sweden. He grew up playing drums and guitar and has cited the Swedish metal band Meshuggah as an early influence.

== Career ==
=== Musician roles ===
Odeholm became widely known through his work with the Swedish metal bands Humanity's Last Breath and Vildhjarta. With Humanity's Last Breath, he serves as guitarist, producer, and primary songwriter. Gear Gods described his contribution to the band's sound by noting that “when it comes to dialing in ultra-tight, low-tuned metal tones, few players have refined the process like Buster Odeholm”.

He has also worked as a writer, producer and drummer (in-studio) for the band Thrown.

=== Production and engineering ===
Odeholm works as a producer, mixer, and mastering engineer. His production style emphasizes extremely low tunings, precise digital editing, and detailed sound design. A scholarly analysis published by Routledge identified him as a key figure in contemporary extreme metal production, highlighting his hybrid role as both performer and producer and his influence on the genre's sound aesthetics.

He has also contributed educational materials through URM Academy and has demonstrated his production techniques on the series Nail the Mix.

In 2021, he mixed the tracks on Vemod, an album by the Swedish metalcore band Forgetting the Memories.

=== Other ventures ===
Odeholm is the founder of Odeholm Audio, which develops sample libraries, amp simulators, and other production tools aimed at modern metal producers.

He also has a signature guitar line with Hapas Guitars, the Ashen Signature Collection, designed for extremely low tunings used in his production style.

Odeholm has been endorsed by Audeze, Fortin Amplification, Neural DSP, Hapas Guitars, Paiste, LB Drums, and Wincent Sticks.

== Style and influence ==
Odeholm is strongly associated with the rhythmically complex, heavily down-tuned metal style sometimes referred to as "thall". Academic analysis has highlighted his use of extended-range guitars, extreme low tunings, sample layering, digital precision, and percussive riff construction. In an interview with Betreutes Proggen, he explained aspects of his compositional philosophy:

- "The riffs you can't really predict, are the ones created note by note. It's meant to sound inhuman."
- "I use technology way more than others might. I am not trying to make music that sounds like a band. ... I am trying to make something else."
