= Wucan =

German rock band

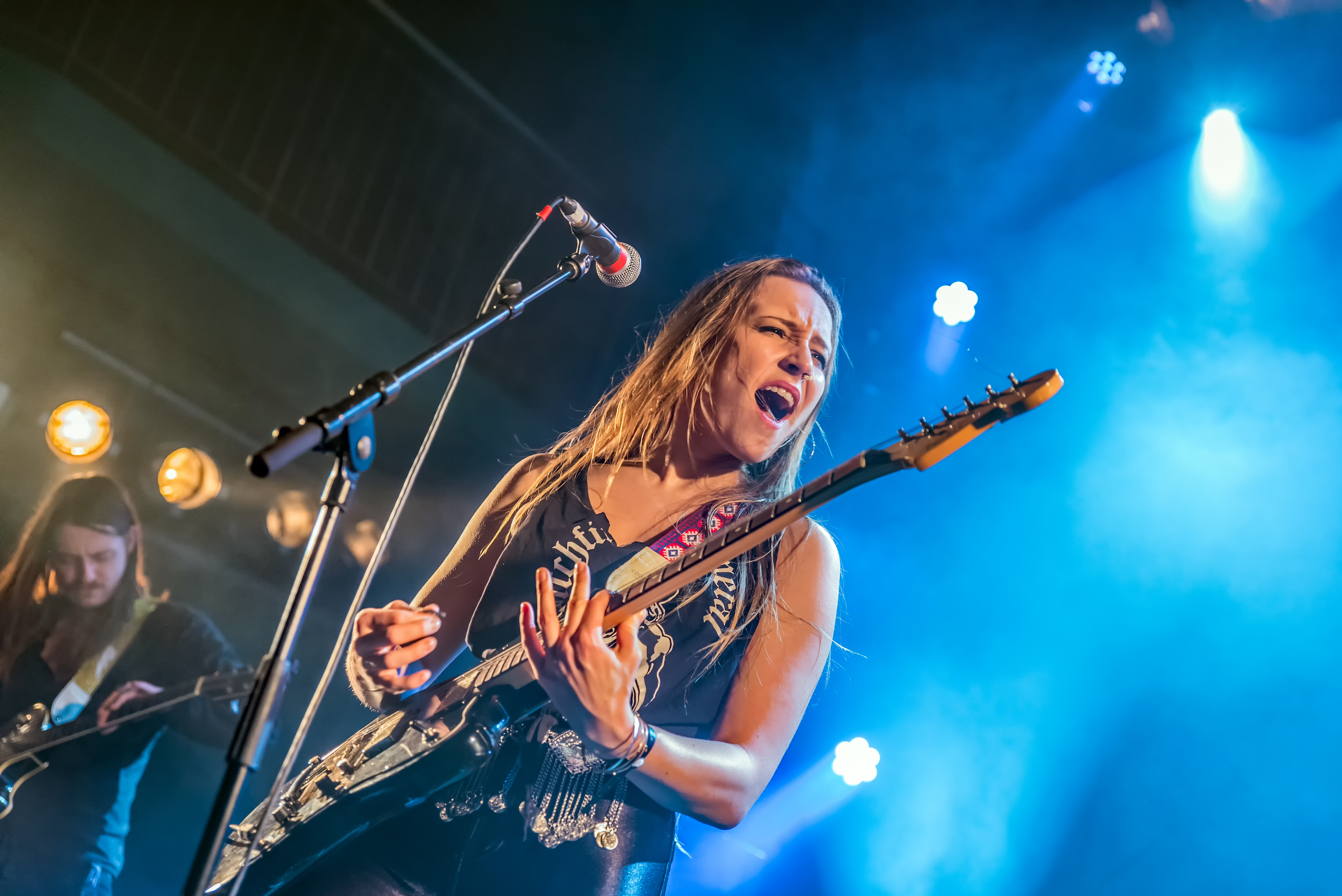
- Wucan performing in 2018

Background information
- Origin: Dresden, Germany
- Genres: Hard rock, folk rock, psychedelic rock, doom rock, stoner rock
- Years active: 2011–present
- Labels: Long Branch Records, Metalizer, MiG
- Members: Francis Tobolsky; Tim George; Alexander Karlisch; Philip Knöfel
- Past members: Pätz; Ollie; Marc; Patrick Dröge; Leo Vaessen
- Website: wucan-music.de

Wucan is a German rock band from Dresden. The band was formed in 2011 and has released an EP and two studio albums to date. Francis Tobolsky (flute, rhythm guitar, vocals), Tim George (lead guitar) and Patrik Dröge (bass guitar) are the founding members of the band and have remained in the line-up since. Philip Knöfel is the current drummer after several other drummers left the band.

== History ==
In December 2011, singer Francis Tobolsky posted an advertisement in a student magazine with the headline 'Blues Brothers Wanted', with the intention of forming a band. Guitarist Tim George and drummer 'Pätz' joined Tobolsky for rehearsals throughout 2012 and the band's first line-up was complete when Patrik Dröge joined on bass in November the same year.

Throughout 2013, Wucan started songwriting, recording and playing their first gigs as a band. They had also released demos and singles on YouTube.

In July 2014, Pätz left the band shortly after the recording of the debut EP Vikarma. His replacement was a new drummer 'Ollie', who remained with the band for six months before leaving and was replaced by a further drummer 'Marc'.

In February 2015, the band started preparing for their first studio album. A month later they were the main support act for Siena Root during their tour of mainland Europe. Marc only lasted two months in the band before being replaced with Leo Vaessen who was brought in for recordings for the debut album Sow the Wind.

Their second studio album, Reap The Storm, was released on 29 September 2017.

== Musical style ==
Wucan's music can be described as heavy 70s influenced folk rock with hints of stoner and doom. Fans and critics often compare the band's sound to Jethro Tull, because of the continuous use of flute, and Black Sabbath. Wucan fit into the 'retro rock' subgenre along with fellow German bands Kadavar and Zodiac, with the former previously using Wucan as main support on a number of occasions.

== Discography ==
=== Albums ===
- Sow the Wind (2015) (Metalizer Records)
- Reap the Storm (2017) (MIG)
- Heretic Tongues (2022) (Sonic Attack Records)
- Axioms (2025)

=== EP's ===
- Vikarma (2014) (Metalizer Records)
