= Different Realities =

Studio album by Siena Root
- Released: October 13, 2009
- Recorded: 1st–25 March 2009
- Length: 50:55
- Producer: Siena Root

Siena Root chronology
Far from the Sun (2008)	Different Realities (2009)	Pioneers (2014)

Different Realities is the fourth studio album by Swedish rock band Siena Root. It´s an album of two musical pieces, where side A is leaning more to the electric side of Siena Root, and side B more to the acoustic. The B-side is a "raagmala", a series of ragas, that stretch from the morning (Bairagi) to midnight (Jog). It's an all analogue production made for reproduction on vinyl. No digital equipment was involved in the making.

== Track listing ==
All tracks are written by Siena Root, except where noted

We
No.	Title	Writer(s)	Length
1.	"We Are Them"	Siena Root, Martin Linder	10:36
2.	"In the Desert"		3:13
3.	"Over the Mountains"		7:42
4.	"As We Return"		4:00

The Road to Agartha (Raagmala)
No.	Title	Length
5.	"Bairagi"	4:04
6.	"Bhairavi"	3:28
7.	"Ahir Bhairav"	3:44
8.	"Bhimpalasi"	1:24
9.	"Bhimpalasi"	2:27
10.	"Jog"	10:17
Total length:		50:55

== Credits ==
Writing, performance and production credits are adapted from the album liner notes.

=== Personnel ===
==== Siena Root ====
- Sam Riffer – bass, double bass, darbuka
- KG West – guitar, sitar, organ, rhodes piano, synthesizer, tzouras
- Love H Forsberg – drums, percussion
- Anna Sandberg – recorder, Rauschpfeife, vocals, tambourine
- Tängman – Hurdy-gurdy, tambourine
- Janet Jones Simmonds – vocals

==== Production ====
- Siena Root – Record producer, recording, mixing, mastering
- Per Ängkvist – recording, mixing
- Christoffer Stannow – mastering

==== Visual art ====
- Siena Root – cover artwork, layout
- Christian Olani – cover artwork, layout

=== Studios ===
- Real Music Studio, Stockholm, Sweden – recording, mixing
- Cosmos Mastering – mastering

== Charts ==
Chart	Peak position
Swedish Albums (Sverigetopplistan)	35
