= Rising Insane =

German metalcore band

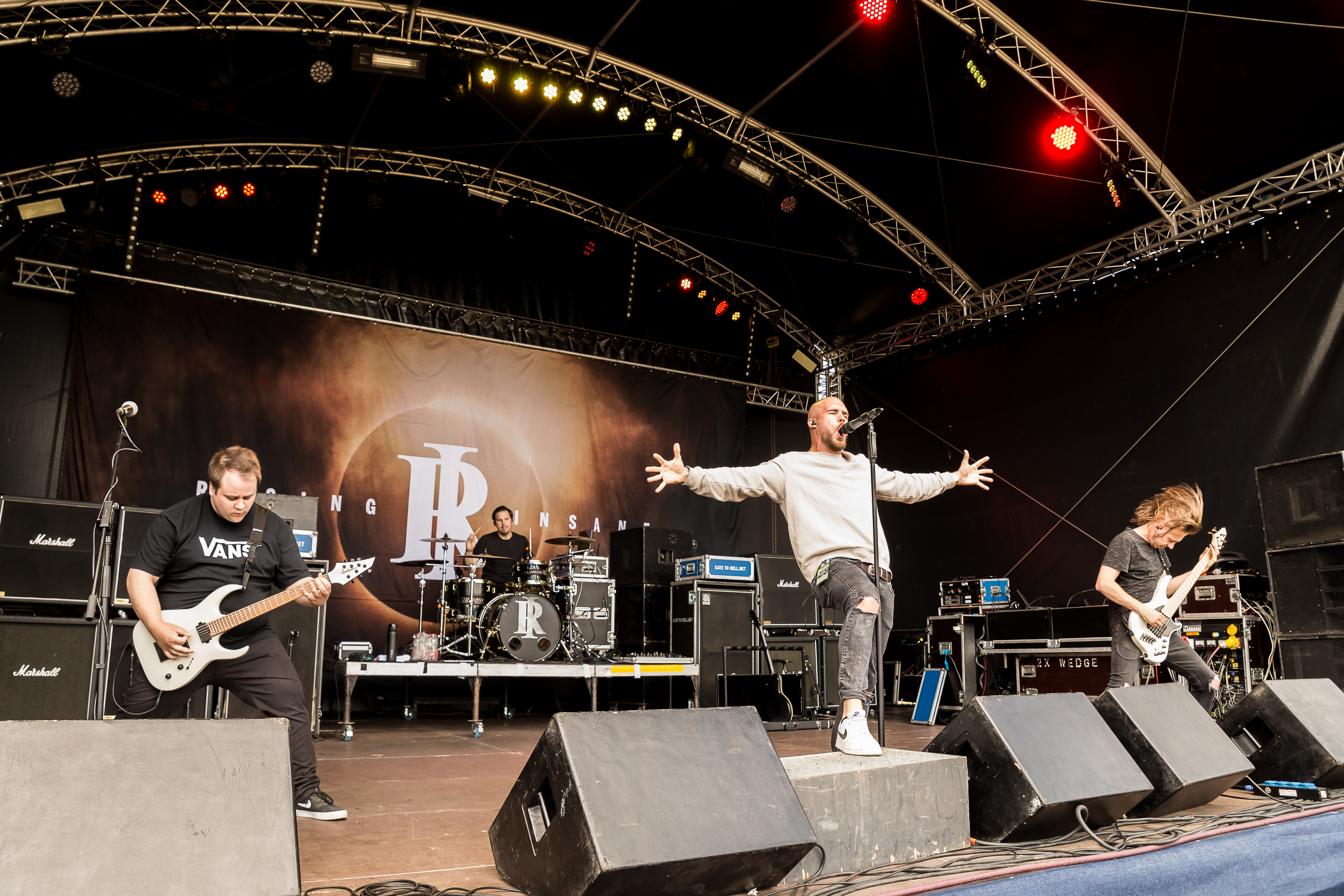

Background information
- Origin: Schierbrok, Lower Saxony, Germany
- Genres: metalcore; Post-hardcore
- Years active: 2012–present
- Labels: recordJet; Long Branch Records
- Members: Aaron Steineker; Florian Köchy; Sven Polizuk; Ulf Hedenkamp; Robert Kühling
- Past members: Helge Dannebaum
- Website: risinginsane.de

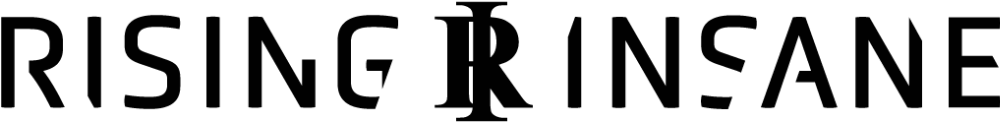
Rising Insane Logo

Rising Insane is a German metalcore band based out of Schierbrok, a community in the Ganderkesee municipality formed in 2012.

== History ==
=== Formation in 2012 and departure of Dannebaum in 2013 ===
At the start, the band consisted of vocalist Aaron Steineker, guitarist and backing vocalist Florian Köchy, guitarist Helge Dannebaum, bassist Ulf Hedenkamp, and drummer Robert Kühling. A year into the project, guitarist Helge Dannebaum left the group and was replaced with Sven Polizuk.

=== Nation and Impericon Festival (2017-2019) ===
Within the five-year gap between the band formation and their first album, Rising Insane was in the midst of founding the Springsane Festival and making contact with the German metal scene. The band's very first major album titled Nation was recorded and released in 2017 while recording under German record label recordJet. In 2018, the band went on tour throughout Germany and Austria with fellow German metalcore band Annisokay. In 2019, Rising Insane won the Next Generation competition in the jury prize category, and they were set to perform at the Impericon Festival in Leipzig.

=== Porcelain and Recovered, COVID-19 pandemic (2019–2020) ===
In 2019, Rising Insane released their second major album, Porcelain, after signing with Long Branch Records. In that time period, Aaron Steineker's sister died, causing him to deal with post-traumatic stress. In 2020, COVID-19 hit, forcing a halt to their tours and the lockdowns, which gave them the time to work on their guitar sounds and release two EPs, Recovered, a metal cover label consisting of four songs; Blinding Lights by The Weeknd, Physical by Dua Lipa, Maniac by Michael Sembello, and Heathens by Twenty One Pilots. and an acoustic version of Porcelain, consisting of four songs in acoustic version from their Porcelain album.

=== Afterglow (2021) ===
In December 2021, Rising Insane released their third major album titled Afterglow. Beforehand, they dropped 2 music videos from the album, titled "Meant to Live" and "Afterglow".

=== Demons and Wildfires, and Rejoining Long Branch Records (2023–2024) ===
In 2023, Rising Insane released their third EP titled Demons. The year beforehand, they were meant to be a supporting act along with UnityTX for a European Tour headlined by Deez Nuts but was postponed due to the ongoing COVID restrictions and moved the tour to 2023. In 2024, they released their fourth major album titled Wildfires after re-signing with Long Branch Records. In the same year they released the album, they hosted the Wildfires Tour that year throughout Germany in November and December.

=== DEATHRACE (2025-present) ===
Rising Insane released a music video in October 2025 called "Error" featuring Steven Jones of Bleed From Within. In 2026, band dropped another video for Good Enough with Caskets as a guest, and soon announced the release of their fifth studio album, "DEATHRACE", which is set to be released on August 21, 2026. In doing so, they dropped a music video for the song DEATHRACE. Then in June that year, they dropped another track and video for DARK featuring fellow German metalcore act ACCVSED!

== Members ==
=== Current ===
- Aaron Steineker – clean & unclean vocals (2012–present)
- Florian Köchy – clean vocals, guitar (2012–present)
- Sven Polizuk – guitar (2013–present)
- Ulf Hedenkamp – bass (2012–present)
- Robert Kühling – drums (2012–present)

=== Past ===
- Helge Dannebaum – guitar (2012–2013)

== Discography ==
Albums

Year	Title	Label	Peak positions		
Year	Title	Label	GER	CH	AUT
2017	Nation	recordJet	—	—	—
2019	Porcelain	Long Branch Records	—	—	—
2021	Afterglow	Long Branch Records	—	—	—
2024	Wildfires	Long Branch Records	—	—	—

EPs

- 2020: Recovered
- 2016: Porcelain (Acoustic)
- 2023: Demons

Music Videos

Title	Ref.	Year
"Porcelain"		2019
"Awakening"		2019
"Last Fragments"		2019
"Blinding Light"		2020
"Physical"		2020
"Maniac"		2020
"Heathens"		2020
"Born to Live (Reimagined)"		2020
"Meant to Live"		2021
"Afterglow"		2021
"Serenade"		2021
"Something Inside of Me"		2021
"Bend and Break"		2021
"Reign"		2024
"Malicious"		2024
"Burn"		2024
"Lighthouse"		2024
"Carousel"		2024
"Monster"		2024
"Error" feat. Steven Jones		2025
"Good Enough" feat. Caskets		2026
"DEATHRACE"		2026
"DARK" feat. ACCVSED		2026
