= The Didact =

Studio album by Means End
- Released: May 1, 2013
- Genre: Progressive metal
- Length: 51:24
- Labels: Independent, Rogue Records America
- Producer: Acle Kahney

Means End chronology
EP (2012)	The Didact (2013)

Professional ratings
Review scores
Source	Rating
Sputnikmusic	link
The Circle Pit	link
got-djent	link

The Didact is the self-produced debut album by Swedish progressive metal band, Means End, released in 2013. The album name "The Didact" derives from the Ancient Greek word, "didaktikós", meaning to instruct or be taught.

== Musical and lyrical style ==
The album contains intellectual and philosophical lyrics about numerous topics and melds them together as the lines between humanity and technology are thinned. The instrumentation incorporates electronic choirs, polyrhythmic riffs, jazz-influenced bass lines, and dynamic vocals among many other things. The album also features a linear tempo rendition of Nox Aurumque, originally composed by Eric Whitacre.

== Track listing ==
No.	Title	Length
1.	"Candle in The Dark"	3:23
2.	"Omega Barrier"	4:10
3.	"Crimson Interloper"	3:36
4.	"Aeronaut"	3:55
5.	"Prometheus"	3:53
6.	"Mourning Star"	3:57
7.	"Magnanimous"	4:49
8.	"Lied Von Leid"	4:06
9.	"Nox Aurumque"	5:12
10.	"Sun Wukong"	5:08
11.	"Arbiter Of Time"	4:29
12.	"To Love"	4:46
Total length:		51:24

== Personnel ==
- Robert Luciani – lead vocals
- Rasmus Hemse – bass
- Christian Schreil – drums
- Leonard Eastgrove – guitar

Acle Kahney (member of Tesseract, ex-Fellsilent), of 4D studios, mixed and mastered this album.
