= Där skogen sjunger under evighetens granar =

2025 studio album by Vildhjarta

+ Där skogen sjunger under evighetens granar +

Studio album by Vildhjarta
- Released: 30 May 2025
- Genre: Progressive metal; djent; art metal
- Length: 56:52
- Label: Century Media
- Producer: Calle Thomér; Buster Odeholm

Vildhjarta chronology
Måsstaden under vatten (2021)	+ Där skogen sjunger under evighetens granar + (2025)

Professional ratings
Review scores
Source	Rating
Blabbermouth.net	9/10

Där skogen sjunger under evighetens granar (Swedish: "Where the forest sings under the eternal spruce trees"; stylized with plus signs) is the third studio album by Swedish progressive metal band Vildhjarta. It was released on 30 May 2025 through Century Media Records. The album features songwriting contributions from founding member and guitarist Daniel Bergström, who departed the band in early March 2025.

== Background and promotion ==
On 14 August 2023, Vildhjarta released the album's first single entitled "Den spanska känslan". On 16 October 2023, "Ylva", the second single from the album, was released. "Kristallfågel", the third single from the album, was released on Christmas on 25 December 2023. "Sargasso", the fourth single from the album, was released on 6 March 2025, in which Vildhjarta announced the title of their new album, entitled "Där skogen sjunger under evighetens granar".

In March 2025, it was confirmed that guitarist and founding member Daniel Bergström was no longer part of the band. Prior to his departure, however, Bergström had contributed to the songwriting of multiple songs that appear on the new album. With Bergström's departure, there are no original members left in the band.

== Track listing ==
All song titles are stylized with + positioned at the start and end of each title.

All lyrics are written by Vilhelm Bladin; all music is composed by Calle Thomér, with additional co-writers listed.

No.	Title	Co-writer(s)	Length
1.	"Byta ut alla stjärnor på himlen mot plustecken (Note: Swedish: "Replace all the stars in the sky with plus signs")"	Daniel Bergström	3:44
2.	"Två vackra svanar (Note: Swedish: "Two beautiful swans")"		5:13
3.	"Sargasso"		6:45
4.	"Ylva (Note: Swedish: "She-wolf")"	Buster Odeholm	4:41
5.	"Där mossan möter havet (Note: Swedish: "Where the moss meets the sea")"		3:48
6.	"Röda läppar, söta äpplen (Note: Swedish: "Red lips, sweet apples")"	Odeholm	3:48
7.	"Kristallfågel (Note: Swedish: "Crystalbird")"		4:03
8.	"? regnet, the ? (Note: Swedish: "? the rain, the ?")"		3:30
9.	"Hösten som togs ifrån mig (Note: Swedish: "The autumn that was taken from me")"		3:49
10.	"Viktlös & evig (Note: Swedish: "Weightless & eternal")"		6:38
11.	"Stjärnblödning (Note: Swedish: "Starbleeding")"	Bergström	3:27
12.	"Den spanska känslan (Note: Swedish: "The Spanish feeling")"	Odeholm; Bergström; Douglas Dahlström	7:26
Total length:			56:52

== Personnel ==
Vildhjarta

- Vilhelm Bladin – vocals, lyrics
- Calle Thomér – guitar, bass, production, drum programming, songwriting
- Buster Odeholm – drums, bass, production, songwriting (tracks 4, 6, 12)

Additional personnel

- Daniel Bergström - songwriting (tracks 1, 11, 12)
- Douglas Dahlström - songwriting (track 12)
- Chris Williams – artwork
- Glenn Lindberg – photography
- Kacper Lewandowski - vocal editing (tracks 2, 3, 5, 6, 8, 9, 10 & 11)

== Charts ==
Chart performance
Chart (2025)	Peak position
Swedish Albums (Sverigetopplistan)	35
Swedish Hard Rock Albums (Sverigetopplistan)	3
UK Albums (OCC)	79
