= Välde =

Studio album by Humanity's Last Breath
- Released: February 12, 2021
- Genre: Deathcore; blackened deathcore; djent; atmospheric black metal
- Length: 51:17
- Label: Unique Leader
- Producer: Buster Odeholm, Randy Slaugh

Humanity's Last Breath chronology
Abyssal (2019)	Välde (2021)	Ashen (2023)

Singles from Välde
- 1. "Vittring" Released: 2 November 2020; 2. "Tide" Released: 5 December 2020; 3. "Glutton" Released: 7 January 2021

Professional ratings
Review scores
Source	Rating
Distorted Sound	8/10
Metal Injection	9/10
Metal Utopia	5/10
Sputnikmusic	3.5/5

Välde (Swedish for Empire) is the third studio album by the Swedish deathcore band Humanity's Last Breath. It was released on 12 February 2021, through Unique Leader Records. Music videos were released for the tracks "Vittring" and "Tide". "Glutton" was also released as a pre-release single on 7 January 2021.

About the relation between the song titles and modern-day issues, guitarist/bassist Buster Odeholm explained, "When you watch the news and you see and hear the way we are going as the human race – it's kinda like 'yeah this is definitely not positive'. If I'm on a podcast or just walking on the street and see something, I can suddenly just get a sentence in my head. And if that resonates with me, I always feel like I want to express that via music. That’s where a lot of these song titles come from." Humanity's Last Breath promoted the album by supporting Jinjer in September and October 2021 and embarking on a European tour with Reflections and Cabal in April 2022.

== Track listing ==
Välde track listing
No.	Title	Length
1.	"Dödsdans"	1:34
2.	"Glutton"	3:37
3.	"Earthless"	4:57
4.	"Descent"	4:27
5.	"Spectre"	4:50
6.	"Dehumanize"	5:23
7.	"Hadean"	4:22
8.	"Tide"	5:08
9.	"Väldet"	2:56
10.	"Sirens"	4:23
11.	"Futility"	4:06
12.	"Vittring"	5:34
Total length:		51:17

== Personnel ==
- Filip Danielsson – vocals
- Calle Thomér – guitar
- Buster Odeholm – guitar, bass
- Klas Blomgren – drums
