= Siena Root =

Swedish band

Background information
- Origin: Stockholm, Sweden
- Genres: Hard rock, blues-rock, progressive rock, psychedelic rock, stoner rock
- Years active: 1997–present
- Labels: Root Rock, Nasoni, Transubstans, Cleopatra, Gaphals, Atomic Fire, Made in Germany, Reigning Phoenix Music
- Members: Sam Riffer; Love Forsberg; Zubaida Solid; Johan Borgström
- Website: sienaroot.com

Siena Root is a Swedish rock band with its roots in late '60s and '70s rock music. The group was founded in Stockholm in the late 1990s. Their sound is based on heavy organ, howling guitars, bass riffing and big drums. It is also often enriched with bluesy soulful vocals, various guest musicians and psychedelic vibes.

The band believes their music has the warm color of Siena, an earthy colour. Because their sound has roots that go deep, they named the band Siena Root.

Siena Root has been touring frequently in Europe since the early 2000s, and producing a wide range of genre-blending songs. Often have the concerts featured prominent guest musicians.

== History ==
Siena Root was formed in Stockholm, Sweden around 1997-1998 by founding members Sam Riffer (bass & vocals), Love H Forsberg (drums, percussion & vocals) and Martin "Maistro" Linder (guitar & vocals). Linder left the group in 2002, before the first official record release and was replaced by KG West (guitar, organ & sitar). Shortly after Linders´ departure Oskar Lundström (lead vocals & organ) joined and a quartet was formed. In 2003 Siena Root signed with British label "Rage Of Achilles" and the highly critically acclaimed debut album "A New Day Dawning" was released in 2004. Siena Root begun to tour Europe and after three tours Oskar decided to leave the group and was replaced by lead vocalist Sanya who first appeared on the Burg Herzberg festival 2005. With Sanya the group recorded a 7" single called "Mountain Songs" and later that year the follow-up album Kaleidoscope. This lineup toured extensively through Europe in 2005, 2006 and 2007. In 2007 Sanya left the group and was replaced by Sartez Faraj (lead vocals & guitar) who had previously worked with the band for a short period of time back in 2000–2001. With this lineup the group released their third album Far From The Sun in 2008. In 2009 Sartez left the group and Riffer, Forsberg & West decided to go on as a trio using different vocalists. In 2009 Different Realities was released. Since 2009 the trio toured with the concept of constantly having different guest musicians (vocalists and others) on stage. By 2011 the double live album Root Jam was released, the album featured past and present vocalists as special guests as well as a large number of past and present instrumentalist guest musicians. In support of Root Jam a three-legged European tour followed. After 11 years of service, West decided to leave the group by 2013. He was replaced by Matte Gustavsson (guitar) and the lineup that's been seen on tour from 2013 to 2015 mainly consisted of Sam Riffer (bass & vocals), Love Forsberg (drums & vocals), Joe Nash (lead vocals), Erik Petersson (organ) and Matte Gustavsson (guitar). 2013 also saw the release of the 7" single entitled "Conveniently Blind". That lineup also released Pioneers in 2014, the band's first studio album in five years. Pioneers was followed by a 30-day European tour and was also the band's first release that was co-released on a US-label, Cleopatra. Joe Nash decided to leave the band in March, during the first Pioneers-tour, but stayed over the summer and did the summer festivals. Nash was replaced by Samuel Björö that had a short tenure with the band until the summer of 2017. In 2016 the band went on to record the next album A Dream of Lasting Peace, this time the band recorded in the Silence Studio in western Sweden. A Dream of Lasting Peace was released in May 2017 and was also followed by a European tour and summer festivals, the tour included shows in big arenas when Siena Root opened for Deep Purple. When Samuel departed the band toured Spain and Portugal, once again together with Sanya behind the microphone. Part of the occasion was filmed in ”Sol de Sants Studio” and released by Spanish television as the band did a version of one of their classic, "Trippin'", from A New Day Dawning. It was later released as a B-side on the 7”-single "In the Fire" featuring Swedish blues singer Lisa Lystam. Lisa also shared vocal duties with blues-rock singer Zubaida Solid on the band's latest studio album, The Secret of Our Time. This album was released in 2020 and featured guest appearances. Kg West featured on the album as well as Stefan Koglek from the band Colour Haze among many others. Another guitarist to be featured on the album is Johan Borgström; he is today part of the spine of Siena Root together with Zubaida, Riffer and Forsberg.

== Discography ==
Studio albums

- A New Day Dawning (2004)
- Kaleidoscope (2006)
- Far from the Sun (2008)
- Different Realities (2009)
- Pioneers (2014)
- A Dream of Lasting Peace (2017)
- The Secret of Our Time (2020)
- Revelation (2023)

Live albums

- Kalejdoskop -Live at ROJ (2010)
- Root Jam (2011)
- Made in KuBa (2025)

== Personnel ==
- Sam Riffer – Bass
- Love Forsberg – Percussion
- Zubaida Solid – Vocals & Organ
- Johan Borgström – Guitar
