= Måsstaden =

Studio album by Vildhjarta
- Released: 28 November 2011
- Genres: Progressive metal, djent, post-metal
- Length: 51:31
- Label: Century Media
- Producer: Daniel Bergström

Vildhjarta chronology
Omnislash (2009)	Måsstaden (2011)	Thousands of Evils (2013)

Professional ratings
Review scores
Source	Rating
About.com	3.5/5 stars
Metal Injection	(Positive)
Metal Underground	3.5/5 stars
Sputnikmusic	4/5 stars
Ultimate Guitar	7.8/10 stars

Måsstaden (Swedish: "The seagull town") is the debut album by Swedish metal band Vildhjarta. Released on 28 November 2011, the album peaked at 37 on the US Top Heatseekers chart. The record was the first release to feature co-lead vocalist Vilhelm Bladin and last to include founding member (and third guitarist) Jimmie Åkerström, who left Vildhjarta in April 2012 due to difficulties from being unable to match the evolving playing and songwriting skill of the rest of the band. Åkerström was never replaced and thus left Vildhjarta without a third guitarist since his leaving.

Måsstaden was a breakthrough success and led to positive reviews and an expanded international fanbase. The musical style found on the album, often described by fans as "thall", would continue to influence multiple bands and artists within the djent scene.

For the album's tenth anniversary a special remixed/remastered edition, titled Måsstaden (forte), was released on 28 January 2022 on both compact disc and vinyl.

== Reception ==
The album received generally positive critical reviews. Natalie Zed of About.com gave the album 3.5/5 and said that "For fans of djent, this is definitely an album to pay attention to", describing the instrumentation as "dense as a forest of thorns, the songs are constructed in such a way that the listener has room to explore, to wander, and to eventually get lost and caught within the sound." Nina Saeidi writing for Metal Injection was very positive about the album, and concluded that "Måsstaden is stunningly beautiful and filled with a dark energy that is often hard to find in the copycat genre in which Vildhjarta are boundary pushers. This album is perfect for those in need of a fast and furious djent fix with the occasional unexpected interlude that will take you by surprise."

While Metal Underground were still on the whole positive about the album, they were critical that "for as good as the music is, Vildhjarta don't do much to step out of the shadow of their main inspiration, making comparisons to Meshuggah at times a bit too accurate", though they concluded the review by saying "Måsstaden is a good album from a new band that's more of a taste of what's to come, rather than a fully evolved sound. The clean vocals on "Traces" are a promising sign and hopefully, with time, Vildhjarta will evolve into something much greater. They have the talent; it's now just whether or not they have the creativity."

== Forte edition ==
A remixed/remastered edition of Måsstaden was released on 28 January 2022 for the record's tenth anniversary. The reissue was titled Måsstaden (forte) and it features revamped/redone drums and bass guitar. Most production and mixing was done by the band's current drummer Buster Odeholm, with assistance from Sworn In drummer Chris George.

== Track listing ==
No.	Title	Length
1.	"Shadow"	3:39
2.	"Dagger"	4:26
3.	"Eternal Golden Monk"	3:52
4.	"Benblåst (Note: Swedish (lit.): "Bonestorm")"	3:14
5.	"Östpeppar (Note: Swedish: "East pepper".)" (Instrumental)	1:56
6.	"Traces"	6:13
7.	"Phobon Nika (Note: Ancient Greek: "Fear conquers".)" (Instrumental)	2:54
8.	"Måsstadens Nationalsång (Note: Swedish: "Seagull Town's National Anthem".)" (Instrumental)	0:47
9.	"When No One Walks with You"	3:19
10.	"All These Feelings"	6:53
11.	"Nojja (Note: Swedish colloquialism: "paranoia".)" (Instrumental)	1:42
12.	"Deceit"	5:09
13.	"The Lone Deranger"	7:27
Total length:		51:31

Pre-order Bonus Track
No.	Title	Length
14.	"To Be Continued" (Instrumental)	3:51
Total length:		55:22

iTunes Bonus Tracks
No.	Title	Length
15.	"All for the Sake" (Instrumental)	1:57
16.	"Of Others" (Instrumental)	3:00
Total length:		1:00:19

== Personnel ==
=== Vildhjarta ===
- Daniel Ädel – vocals
- Vilhelm Bladin – vocals
- Daniel Bergström – guitar
- Calle-Magnus Thomér – guitar
- Jimmie Åkerström – guitar
- Johan Nyberg – bass
- David Lindkvist – drums

=== Production ===
- Daniel Bergström - producer
- Jens Bogren – mastering
- Lance Grabmiller – additional production
- Jared Howe – additional production
- Sebastian Krawczuk – additional production
- Rickard Westman – album art
