= Allt =

Swedish progressive metalcore band

- Origin: Karlskoga, Sweden
- Genres: Progressive metalcore; thall; djent; deathcore
- Years active: 2020–present
- Label: Century Media Records
- Members: Robin Malmgren; Adam Björk; Viktor Florman; Samuel Mills; Olle Nordström

Allt is a Swedish progressive metalcore band from Karlskoga, formed in 2020. The band has released two EPs and their debut album, From the New World, was released on October 4th 2024. The band has supported and toured alongside bands such as Animals as Leaders, Imminence, Aviana, and Bleed From Within.

== History ==
=== Formation and EPs (2020–2022) ===
The band formed in September 2020 in Karlskoga and chose the name "Karmanline". They later rebranded as "Allt", meaning "everything" in Swedish, to "reflect the band's philosophy towards music". Their debut EP, Dark Waters, was released the following month. On 29 January 2021, only 3 months after its release, the band released the instrumental version of the EP. The band released their second EP, The Seed of Self-Destruction, in April 2022. Drummer Adam Björk joined during the writing of the EP. Later that year, the band signed to Century Media Records.

=== From the New World (2023–2025) ===
In January 2023, the band released the single "Emanate", alongside a music video created by Riivata Visuals that the band said was "inspired by sci-fi classics like 'Blade Runner', 'Ex Machina', and 'The Matrix'". Another single, titled "The Orphan Breed", was released in November 2023.

In June 2024, the band released the single "Remnant", and announced they would be joining Imminence's The Black European tour alongside Aviana in October. The following month the band simultaneous released the breakthrough single "Aquila" and announced their debut studio album From the New World would be releasing 4 October 2024. The band said the album would have a dystopian theme, inspired by Terminator 2. The final single for the album, titled "Echoes", was released in September 2024. Upon the release of the album, the band announced a European tour taking place in March 2025. The album was well-received and was met with positive reviews. On 23 October 2025, the band released a deluxe edition of the album, including unplugged versions of "Aquila", "Echoes" and "Remnant", as well as instrumentals of all tracks.

=== Ataraxia (2025–present) ===
In November 2025, the band confirmed they were recording their next studio album, scheduled for release in 2026.

During North American touring dates in April and May of 2026, the band previewed an unreleased song from the album, titled "Snowblind". The song was subsequently released as a single on 21 May, alongside the announcement of their second studio album, Ataraxia, scheduled for release on 31 July.

== Musical style ==
The band's style has been described as metalcore, progressive metalcore, thall, djent, and deathcore.

== Members ==
Current

- Robin Malmgren – vocals (2020–present)
- Viktor Florman – guitar (2020–present)
- Samuel Mills – bass (2020–present)
- Olle Nordström – guitar (2020–present)
- Adam Björk – drums (2021–present)

Timeline

== Discography ==
=== Studio albums ===
List of studio albums, with selected details
Title	Album details
From the New World	Released: 4 October 2024; Label: Century Media Records
Ataraxia	Released: 31 July 2026; Label: Century Media Records

=== Extended plays ===
List of extended plays
Title	EP details
Dark Waters	Released: 30 October 2020; Label: Century Media Records
The Seed of Self-Destruction	Released: 28 April 2022; Label: Century Media Records

=== Singles ===
List of singles
Title	Year	Album
"Odium"	2020	Dark Waters EP
"Covenant"	2020	Dark Waters EP
"Quietus"	2020	Dark Waters EP
"Blindsight"	2020	Dark Waters EP
"Rupture"	2021	—N/a
"Paralyzed"	2022	The Seed of Self-Destruction EP
"The Deep Blue Silent"	2022	The Seed of Self-Destruction EP
"Emanate"	2023	From the New World
"The Orphan Breed"	2023	From the New World
"Remnant"	2024	From the New World
"Aquila"	2024	From the New World
"Echoes"	2024	From the New World
"Snowblind"	2026	Ataraxia
"Omertà"	2026	Ataraxia
"Avalon"	2026	Ataraxia

=== Music videos ===
List of music videos, showing year released, album and director(s)
Title	Year	Album	Director(s)	Link
"Odium"	2020	Dark Waters EP	Magnus Jonsson	
"Covenant"	2020	Dark Waters EP	Magnus Jonsson	
"Quietus"	2020	Dark Waters EP	Magnus Jonsson	
"Blindsight"	2020	Dark Waters EP	Magnus Jonsson	
"Rupture"	2021	—N/a	Tuomas Kurikka & Patrik Nuorteva (Riivata Visuals)	
"Paralyzed"	2022	The Seed of Self-Destruction EP	Tuomas Kurikka & Patrik Nuorteva (Riivata Visuals)	
"Emanate"	2023	From the New World	Tuomas Kurikka & Patrik Nuorteva (Riivata Visuals)	
"The Orphan Breed"	2023	From the New World	Tuomas Kurikka & Patrik Nuorteva (Riivata Visuals)	
"Remnant"	2024	From the New World	Tuomas Kurikka & Patrik Nuorteva (Riivata Visuals)	
"Aquila"	2024	From the New World	Tuomas Kurikka & Patrik Nuorteva (Riivata Visuals)	
"Echoes"	2024	From the New World	Tuomas Kurikka & Patrik Nuorteva (Riivata Visuals)	
"Snowblind"	2026	Ataraxia	Tuomas Kurikka & Patrik Nuorteva (Riivata Visuals)	
"Omertà"	2026	Ataraxia	Anna Edstedt & Hampus Ströberg	
"Avalon"	2026	Ataraxia	Tuomas Kurikka & Patrik Nuorteva (Riivata Visuals)	
"High Hopes"	2026	Ataraxia	Tuomas Kurikka & Patrik Nuorteva (Riivata Visuals)	

== Awards and nominations ==
Heavy Music Awards

Year	Nominee / work	Award	Result
2025	From the New World	Best Breakthrough Album	Nominated
2025	Allt	Best International Breakthrough Artist	Nominated
