= Exploring Birdsong =

British progressive rock band

- Origin: Liverpool, Merseyside, England
- Genre: Progressive rock
- Years active: 2017–present
- Label: Long Branch
- Members: Lynsey Ward; Jonny Knight; Matt Harrison

Exploring Birdsong are a British progressive rock band from Liverpool, Merseyside, England. Since their inception, the band have released two EPs along with their debut album, Every House We Built.

== History ==
Exploring Birdsong formed in September 2017 when drummer Matt Harrison met singer and pianist Lynsey Ward while they were studying at the Liverpool Institute for Performing Arts. They were joined by bassist and keyboardist Jonny Knight, completing their lineup.

On 9 September 2019, Exploring Birdsong signed with Long Beach Records, a sub-label of SPV GmbH. Two months later, they released their debut EP entitled The Thing With Feathers, which was released on 29 November to positive reviews. On 24 March 2023, the band released their second EP entitled Dancing in the Face of Danger. This EP also received positive reviews.

In February 2024, Exploring Birdsong released their single "The Collapse", followed by "Turntail" four months later. By October, the band released the single "Weight in Gold" then released another one entitled "Stitch". On 12 December 2024, Exploring Birdsong released their single "All I Lack" while announcing that they were working on their debut studio album. On 5 November 2025, the band released another single entitled "Romanticise".

On 4 February 2026, Exploring Birdsong released the single "42". 25 March 2026, they announced their debut studio album Every House We Built and released the music video for "You Like It Best When It Hurts".

== Musical style ==
Exploring Birdsong does not use a guitarist in their music. Instead, they depend on piano, synth, and bass that make their songs densely layered, melodic and overflowing.

== Members ==
- Lynsey Ward – lead vocals, keyboards
- Jonny Knight – bass, keyboards, backing vocals
- Matt Harrison – drums, percussion, backing vocals

=== Live members ===
- Mathilda Riley - backing vocals
- Paige Lucy - backing vocals

== Discography ==
Credits taken from Apple Music.

=== Studio albums ===
Title	Details	Peak chart positions		
Title	Details	UK Digital	UK Independent	UK Independent Album Breakers
Every House We Built	Released: 26 June 2026; Label: Long Branch Records; Formats: CD, digital download, streaming	35	38	6

=== EPs ===
List of EPs, with selected details
Title	Details	Peak chart positions
Title	Details	UK Digital
The Thing with Feathers	Released: 29 November 2019; Label: Long Branch Records; Formats: CD, digital download, streaming	—
Dancing in the Face of Danger	Released: 24 March 2023; Label: Long Branch Records; Formats: CD, digital download, streaming	82

=== Singles ===
Title	Year	Album
"(Don't Fear) The Reaper"	2018	Non-album single
"The River"	2019	The Thing with Feathers
"The Downpour"	2019	The Thing with Feathers
"Ever the Optimist"	2022	Dancing in the Face of Danger
"Bear the Weight"	2023	Dancing in the Face of Danger
"Diamond Eyes"	2023	Non-album singles
"The Collapse"	2024	Non-album singles
"Turntail"	2024	Non-album singles
"Weight in Gold"	2024	Non-album singles
"Stitch"	2024	Non-album singles
"All I Lack"	2024	Non-album singles
"Romanticise"	2025	Every House We Built
"42"	2026	Every House We Built
"You Like It Best When It Hurts"	2026	Every House We Built
"Spy In The House Of Love"	2026	Every House We Built
