= Lim f (EP) =

EP by Means End
- Released: April 17, 2012
- Genre: Progressive metal
- Length: 12:34
- Label: Independent

Means End chronology
Lim f (EP) (2012)	The Didact (2013)

Professional ratings
Review scores
Source	Rating
Sputnikmusic	link

Lim f (EP) is Swedish progressive metal band Means End first self-produced extended play (EP) featuring songs that would later appear on their debut album, The Didact, in a more refined and mastered state. The song "Lost in Thought" appears on The Didact under a different name, "Mourning Star". The EP was originally released August 31, 2011 with a remixed release on April 17, 2012.

== Track listing ==
No.	Title	Length
1.	"Ominous Notions"	4:03
2.	"Magnanimous"	4:45
3.	"Lost in Thought"	3:46
Total length:		12:34

== Personnel ==
- Robert Luciani – lead vocals
- Rasmus Hemse – bass
- Christian Schreil – drums
- Leonard Östlund – guitar
