= Uneven Structure =

French progressive metal band

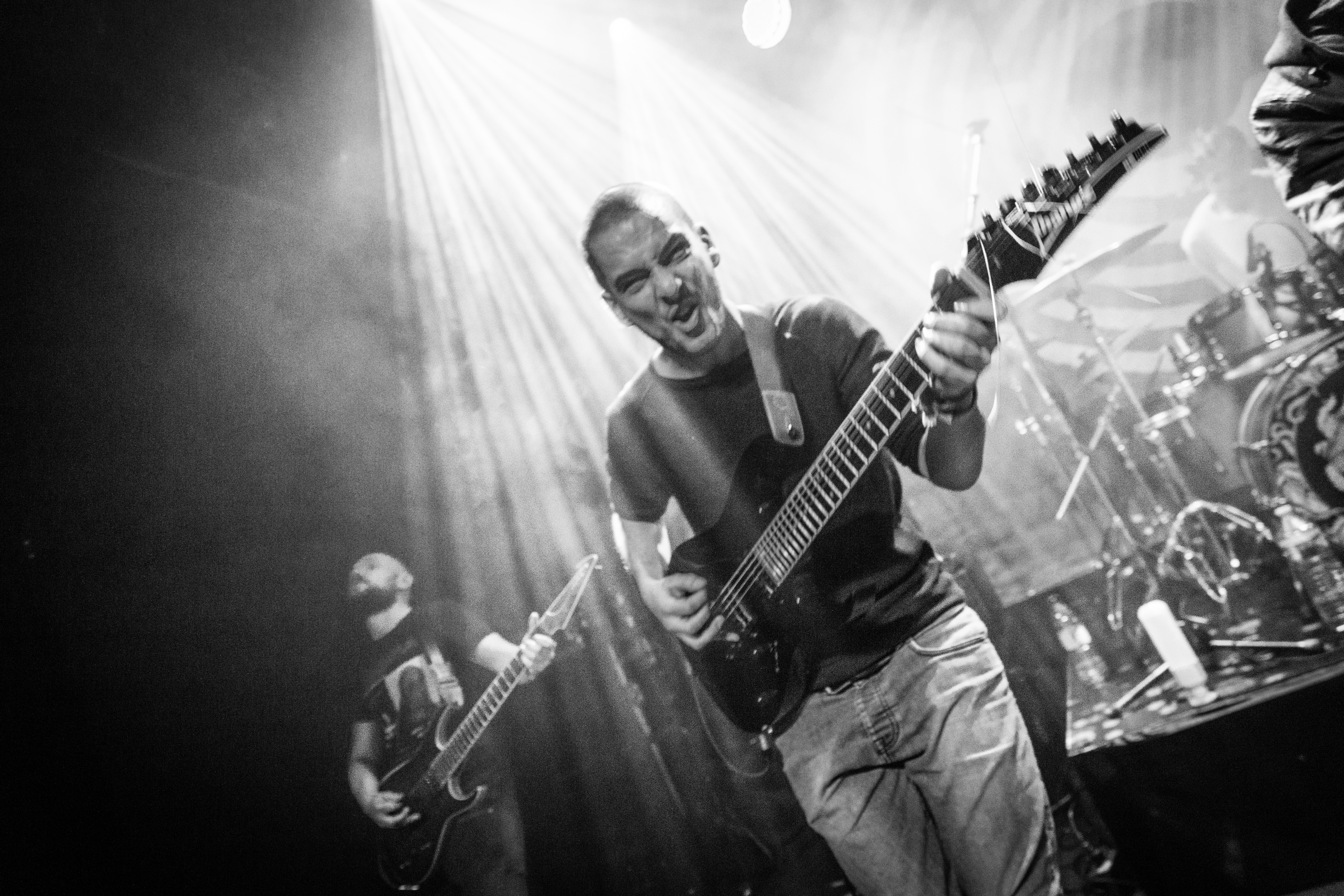
- Uneven Structure at Complexity Fest 2017

Background information
- Origin: Metz, France
- Genres: Progressive metal, djent
- Years active: 2008–present
- Labels: Long Branch, Basick
- Spinoffs: Means End
- Members: Matthieu Romarin; Igor Omodei; Benoit Friedrich; Arnaud Verrier
- Website: http://www.unevenstructure.net/

Uneven Structure is a progressive metal band based in Metz, France. They play a style of post-metal which is heavily influenced by the Swedish extreme metal band Meshuggah. The band blends polyrhythmic passages and extremely low tunings with a heavily layered production style and ambient soundscapes. They are often categorized in the djent movement due to the Meshuggah-like guitar tone they often employ. The band was formed after the split of Longchat, a band which featured Igor Omodei and Benoit Friedrich.

== History ==
The band released an EP entitled 8 in 2009, which was available as a free download in its entirety from the band's official website. The EP was made up entirely of riffs discarded from the full length they were working on at the time (which became Februus) pieced together and arranged into songs. The vocals were provided by Daniel Ädel of the Swedish band Vildhjarta. The band stated that it was put together to show that they could release something, as Februus was taking a long time to write and record.

On May 11, 2011, they signed to Basick Records. They embarked on their first ever tour in September 2011, touring the UK with Chimp Spanner and TesseracT. Their first full-length release, Februus, came out October 31, 2011 and received overwhelmingly positive reviews. Shortly after, drummer Christian Schreil departed from the band to form Means End together with former Vildhjarta vocalist Robert Luciani. With the Euroblast 7 festival approaching, Mike Malyan of the British band Monuments generously acted as a stand in drummer until Jean Ferry joined Uneven Structure in late 2011.

The band began to play live shows again from late 2011 onwards, supporting Protest the Hero, Textures and TesseracT on their respective tours. They also played at the Basick records showcase at Camden Barfly with label mates Chimp Spanner and The Algorithm.

Two videos were uploaded to Uneven Structure's YouTube account which contained clips of new material, suggesting that a new release was in the works. The band later confirmed this via their Facebook page, stating that the album's concept had been decided and that the writing process was in progress.

In 2013, a re-recorded version of their debut EP 8 was released, as a stopgap release to tide fans over until the completion of their second album.

July 21, 2015 was released the first single "Funambule" from the new album La Partition, through Basick Records. It was not until February 24, 2017 that the second single "Incube" was released, this time through Long Branch Records. La Partition in full was released April 21 of the same year while the band was touring Europe supporting Twelve Foot Ninja. The band toured extensively through 2017 and 2018.

Uneven Structure released their third full-length album Paragon on October 18, 2019. The first single "Innocent" premiered on July 25, 2019, accompanied by a music video directed by guitarist Igor Omodei.

== Discography ==
=== Studio albums ===
- Februus (October 31, 2011)
- La Partition (April 21, 2017)
- Paragon (October 18, 2019)

=== EPs ===
- 8 (2009)
- 8 (June 3, 2013) [re-recorded]

== Band members ==
Current

- Igor Omodei – guitar (2008–present)
- Benoit Friedrich – bass (2008–present)
- Matthieu Romarin – vocals (2010–present)
- Arnaud Verrier – drums (2015–present)

Touring Musicians

- Matt Ball - bass (2019–present)

Former

- Daniel Ädel – session vocals on '8' EP (2009)
- Christian Schreil – drums (2009–2011)
- Jean Ferry – drums (2011–2015)
- Aurélien Pereira – guitar (2008–2016)
- Jérôme Colombelli – guitar (2008–2017)
- Steeves Hostin – guitar (2016–2018)
