= Disperse =

American Christian rock band

- Genres: Rock, garage rock
- Labels: Route7Records
- Members: Chelsey Pieratt; Andy Higham; Nic Higham; Chris Billings; Dustin Sanders
- Past members: Erin Davidson; Regina Mullikan; Amber Hillen

Disperse was a Christian rock band from Southern Indiana active from 1996 to 2004. The band was formerly known, with an adjusted roster, as "Stuff."

== Members (as of 2004 dispersion) ==
Chelsey Pieratt - Vocals
Chris Billings - Lead Guitar
Andy Higham - Rhythm Guitar
Nic Higham - Bass Guitar
Dustin Sanders - Drums, Percussion

== Former members ==
Regina Mullikan - Lead Vocals (2000-2001)
Amber Hillen - Keyboards (1997 - 1999)
Erin Davidson - Backing Vocals (1997 - 1999)

== History ==
Formed in early 1996 under the name of "Stuff," the band consisted of members Chelsey Pieratt, Chris Billings, brothers Andy and Nic Higham, and Dustin Sanders, all members of a Christian youth group who wanted to promote their faith through their various musical talents. Under the guidance of the youth minister at their local church, the band began to play at a nearby Christian coffeehouse called the Solid Rock Cafe as an opening act for more notable bands, including Satellite Soul and Just Visiting (now known as the award-winning, world-renowned group The Elms.) Eventually the group began performing solo and headlining their own shows at the Solid Rock Cafe, as well as performing shows at various teen-oriented Christian clubs and coffeehouses across Southern Indiana. In the spring of 2000, because of personal conflict between the members of the band, coupled with tensions between the group and the church leadership that brought them together, the group canceled its upcoming gigs and declared an "indefinite hiatus" and Stuff stopped performing.

In fall of 2000, the group reformed (with lead singer Regina Mullikan replacing Pieratt) and began performing again, with an edgier, less conservative sound and lyrics that incorporated more adult topics, including suicide, teenage pregnancy, relationships, drug and alcohol abuse, and other obstacles encountered by teenagers and young adults growing up in the midwest United States. It was during this time they took the name Disperse, suggested by Andy for its literal meaning and the related imagery of "spreading the word and the faith"

Their newly matured sound and subject matter brought the band an increased amount of popularity and it was during this time that they began performing across Indiana. Once more they found themselves opening for bands like The Elms and Far From Home. However, less than a year after joining the band, Pieratt's replacement Regina dropped out of the band because of creative differences, and Pieratt returned to the microphone.

Encouraged by this newfound success and the return of their original vocalist, the band released their debut CD Better place under the Route Seven Records label. The CD, containing 12 tracks, was a local success and bolstered the band's popularity across the midwest. The CD, recorded at Paradise Studios in South Central Indiana, featured all original tracks as well as a re-imagined version of "Amazing grace" as a closer, with the hymn "Blind man" as a hidden track. The album was sold at both live shows and over internet distributors such as CDbaby.com.

After four more years of playing, Disperse amicably dispersed as each of the members went their separate ways, either to college or careers. The group has made available through internet distribution several of their recorded but as-yet unreleased tracks at no cost.

== Music ==
=== Better Place album track listing ===
1. "Father's Eyes" - 5:00
2. "The Way" - 6:02
3. "Question of Life" - 3:04
4. "Little Girl" - 4:51
5. "Where Were You" - 3:18
6. "Sally" - 4:14
7. "Better Place" - 2:44
8. "Lonely Boy" - 4:01
9. "Hippocritic Oaf" - 3:46
10. "Hippie Tree Song" - 3:31
11. "My Angel" - 3:28
12. "Amazing Grace" - 5:47

=== Unreleased recordings/songs ===
- "Hold Me Jesus"
- "Wheels"
- "He is the One"
- "B's Song"
- "I'm Alive"
- "Door to September"
- "I'm not Alone"
