= Thall =

Thall may refer to:

- Thall Tehsil, a tehsil of Hangu District, Khyber Pakhtunkhwa, Pakistan
  - Thall, Khyber Pakhtunkhwa, a town in Thall Teshil
- Thall (music), a progressive metal subgenre
- Benj Thall (born 1978), American director, film editor, and former child actor

== See also ==
- Thal (disambiguation)
