= Humanity's Last Breath =

Swedish deathcore band

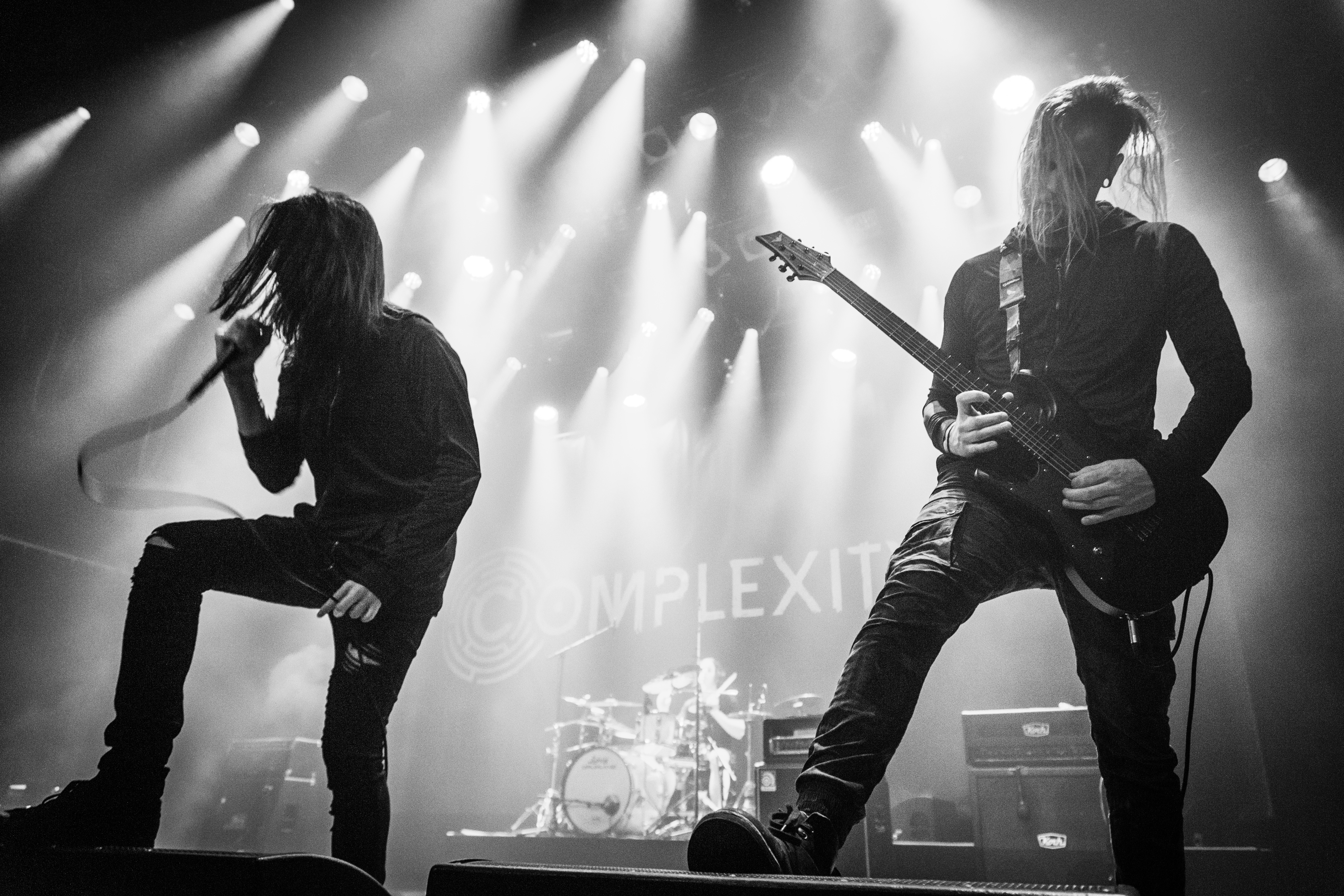
- Humanity's Last Breath performing in 2017

Background information
- Also known as: HLB
- Origin: Helsingborg, Sweden
- Genres: Deathcore; djent; thall; blackened death metal
- Years active: 2009–present
- Labels: Century Media, Unique Leader, Rogue Records America
- Members: Buster Odeholm; Filip Danielsson; Klas Blomgren; Tuomas Kurikka
- Past members: Kristoffer Nillsson; Marcus Hultqvist; Stefan Bengtsson; Johan Aldgård; Marcus Johansson; Marcus Rosell; Calle Thomér
- Website: www.humanityslastbreath.com

Humanity's Last Breath is a Swedish deathcore band, formed in 2009 by guitarists Buster Odeholm (later known as the drummer for Vildhjarta and Thrown) and Kristoffer Nillsson. They released their debut EP Reanimated by Hate in 2010, and their self-titled debut album three years later. Their second studio album, Abyssal, was released in 2019, and their third, Välde, in 2021. In 2023, they released their fourth album Ashen.

The band is known for their blend of deathcore, djent, doom metal, and blackened death metal, and have been compared to acts such as Meshuggah and Vildhjarta, utilizing polyrhythms. They have described their sound as "thall".

Buster Odeholm, who serves as the band's guitarist, producer, and primary songwriter, has also been credited with shaping the modern "thall" sound associated with Humanity's Last Breath and its offshoots. Gear Gods wrote that "when it comes to dialing in ultra-tight, low-tuned metal tones, few players have refined the process like Buster Odeholm".

== Band members ==
=== Current ===
- Filip Danielsson – vocals (2016–present)
- Buster Odeholm – guitar, bass (2014–present), drums (2009–2016)
- Tuomas Kurikka – guitar, vocals (2023–present; live member 2022–2023)
- Klas Blomgren – drums (2020–present)

==== Live ====
- Zach Dean - drums (2025–present (substitute for Klas Blomgren))

=== Former ===
- Johan Aldgård – guitar (2009–2010)
- Marcus Hultqvist – vocals (2009–2014)
- Kristoffer Nillsson – guitar (2009–2014)
- Stefan Bengtsson – bass (2009–2014)
- Marcus Johansson – guitar (2011–2012)
- Marcus Rosell – drums (2016–2020)
- Calle Thomér – guitar (2016–2023)

== Discography ==
=== Studio albums ===
- Humanity's Last Breath (2013)
- Abyssal (2019)
- Välde (2021)
- Ashen (2023)

=== EPs ===
- Reanimated by Hate (2010)
- Structures Collapse (2011)
- Detestor (2016)

=== Singles ===
- Animal (14 Aug 2012)
- Abyssal Mouth (21 Jul 2017)
- Bursting Bowel of Tellus (28 May 2019)
- Fradga (25 Jun 2019)
- Vånda (16 Jul 2019)
- Earthless (12 Jun 2020)
- Vittring (3 Nov 2020)
- Tide (3 Dec 2020)
- Glutton (7 Jan 2021)
- Labyrinthian (11 May 2023)
- Instill (6 Jun 2023)
- Linger (5 Jul 2023)
- Passage (20 Jul 2023)
- Anthracite (3 Apr 2025)
- Godhood (15 Jan 2026)
