= Vildhjarta =

Swedish progressive metal band

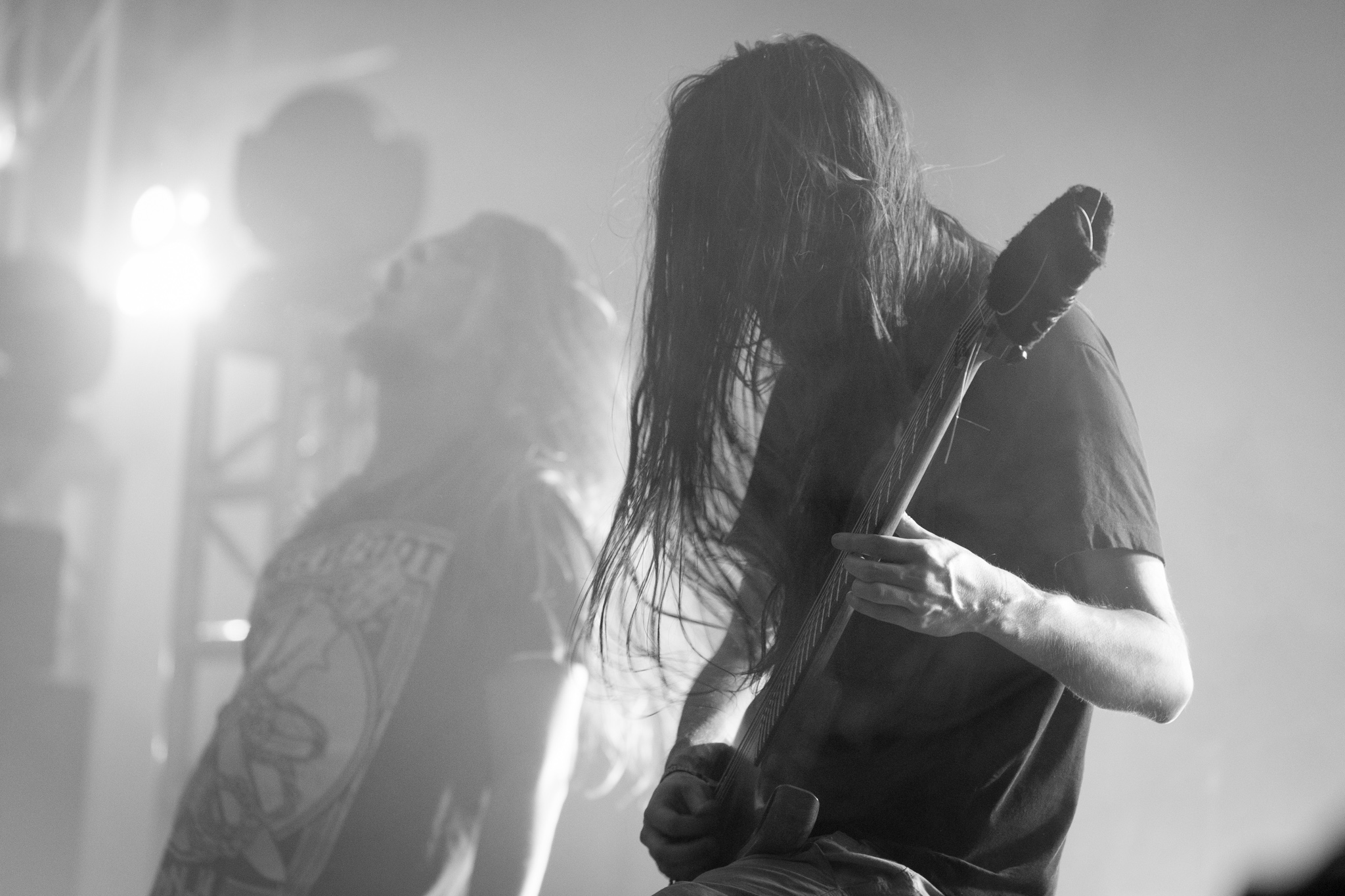
- Vildhjarta at Euroblast Festival 2014

Background information
- Origin: Hudiksvall, Sweden
- Genres: Progressive metal, djent, thall
- Years active: 2005-present
- Label: Century Media
- Members: Calle Thomér; Vilhelm Bladin; Buster Odeholm
- Past members: Daniel Bergström; David Lindkvist; Robert Luciani; Jimmie Åkerström; Daniel Ädel; Johan Nyberg
- Website: www.vildhjartastore.com

Vildhjarta is a Swedish progressive metal band from Hudiksvall, formed in 2005. The band plays in a Meshuggah-influenced djent-style employing heavily-down-tuned guitars, as well as harmonic minor chord progressions, jarring staccato riffs, and layers of reverberant guitars and atmospheres. The band currently consists of guitarist Calle Thomér, vocalist Vilhelm Bladin, and drummer Buster Odeholm. Since 2025, no original members remain in the band, with the longest-running member being Calle Thomér since joining in 2009.

The group released a two-track demo entitled Omnislash in 2009 before they proceeded to sign with Century Media Records in 2011, spawning their debut album Måsstaden that same year. In 2013, they followed up with their first EP, Thousands of Evils, released on an exclusive 1,000-copy vinyl record run. Their second full-length album, Måsstaden under vatten, was released in October 2021.

The word "vildhjärta" means "wildheart" in Swedish. The band's name was inspired by the name of an adventure module for the Swedish tabletop role-playing game Drakar och Demoner.

== History ==
Vildhjarta was founded initially as an idea by Daniel Bergström, Jimmie Åkerström, and Johan Nyberg in 2005 in Hudiksvall, Sweden. The band's earliest days consisted of three members all located in Hudiksvall. The band went through several lineup changes before finally adding vocalists Daniel Ädel, Robert Luciani and drummer David Lindkvist as permanent members in 2008 who lived in Nyköping and Stockholm. In 2009, guitarist Calle Thomér joined the band after being a fan who happened to control the lights at the premiere gig at Brandgaraget, Hudiksvall called "Mayday Metal Fest" were also the death metal band Iscaroth played featuring Vilhelm Bladin on vocals and guitar who later joined on vocals in Vildhjarta.

According to founding member and former guitarist Daniel Bergström, commitment to their fans and "the art of music itself", only allowed for three songs to be released in the four years before the release of their first full-length album. After acquiring additional members and years of trading e-mails with metal label giant Century Media, the band signed a worldwide record contract in the Spring of 2011. Their debut album, måsstaden, is a concept-album that "tells the tale of a hidden and isolated town, narrated in a classic fable manner". Sources of inspiration for the album's story include The Jungle Book and Mumindalen. The album received a favorable review from Consequence of Sound, who called it "a harsh, fantastic, concept work". 2011 also saw a major line-up-change in the band: Vilhelm Bladin replaced Robert Luciani who parted ways and formed the band Means End together with former Uneven Structure drummer Christian Schreil.

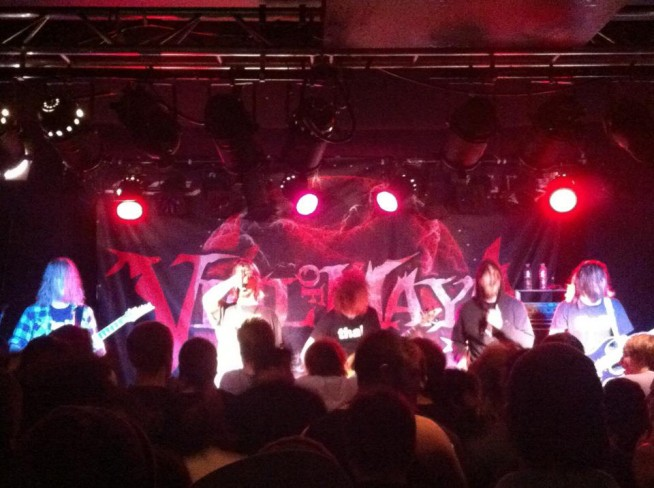
Performing in 2013

On 20 April 2012, third guitarist Jimmie Åkerström left the band due to difficulties he faced from being unable to match the evolving playing and songwriting skill of the rest of the band. His exit effectively reverted the lineup back to their initial two-guitarist setup. Fans were reassured that Åkerström's resigning would not affect the group's writing or touring plans. In May, Vildhjarta embarked on a European tour with Veil of Maya, Volumes, and Structures.

In late 2012, the band announced that they were planning to release an EP of new material, entitled Thousands of Evils. 3 clips from the EP were released and a new song was debuted live at the "Euroblast Tour" in late 2012. The EP was released as a limited edition vinyl. After the release of Thousands of Evils, drummer David Lindkvist was replaced by Buster Odeholm in 2014 and the band became relatively silent about any future endeavors. It wasn't until late 2016 that Vildhjarta unveiled a minute-long teaser for new music. In 2018, the band also confirmed that they would be performing an exclusive show for the 2018 Euroblast festival.

Calle Thomér launched a solo project called "stoort neer", releasing an instrumental album en glad titel på en sorglig skiva on 19 September 2018. The album includes guest contributions from fellow Vildhjarta members. He also played guitar in Humanity's Last Breath (of which Buster Odeholm is a founding member) from 2016 to 2023.

In November 2019, the group released "Den Helige Anden", which would be the first single of the then-tentatively titled second album Kaos2 with an estimated release date of 2020. However, it wasn't until April 2021 before further details would be announced, along with the release of a new single "När de du älskar kommer tillbaka från de döda" from an album now titled måsstaden under vatten. It is the last release to feature founding bassist Johan Nyberg and the first to feature drummer Buster Odeholm, who additionally mixed, mastered and produced the album. On 20 August 2021, two new songs titled "Toxin" and "Kaos2" were released along with the album art, tracklist and the release date of the album, 15 October 2021. On 17 September 2021, the last single from the album, "Penny Royal Poison", was released. On 25 November 2021, the band released the instrumental edition for måsstaden under vatten. On 25 January 2022 Vildhjarta released remixed and remastered versions of måsstaden and Thousands of Evils, entitled måsstaden (forte) and Thousands of Evils (forte). Remixing and mastering for both records was done by drummer Odeholm, with assistance from Chris George, drummer of American metalcore band Sworn In.

In March 2025, it was confirmed that guitarist and founding member Daniel Bergström is no longer part of the band. With Bergström's departure, there are no original members left in the band.

On 30 May 2025, the band released their third full-length album Där skogen sjunger under evighetens granar. On 24 October 2025, the band released the instrumental edition for Där skogen sjunger under evighetens granar.

== Influences and meaning of "thall" ==
Guitarist Calle Thomér has cited the bands Meshuggah, Ion Dissonance, Katatonia, and The Mars Volta as some of the group's most prominent influences.

With their distinct take on djent, Vildhjarta inadvertently coined the accompanying word thall, which the group have used to describe their own music and which has become a meme among the band and its fans. The etymology of thall originates from the slurred pronunciation of the World of Warcraft character Thrall when spoken with a Swedish accent. The word has since become synonymous with the band aesthetically, but more recently, the band has explained that the context of the word is rather vague and has no real explicit meaning; "It can be whatever you want it to be".

== Members ==
Current

- Calle Thomér - guitar (2009-present), bass (2021–present)
- Vilhelm Bladin - vocals (2011-present)
- Buster Odeholm - drums (2014-present), bass (2021–present)

Former

- Daniel Bergström - guitar (2005-2025)
- Jimmie Åkerström - guitar (2005-2012)
- Johan Nyberg - bass (2005-2021)
- David Lindkvist - drums (2008-2014)
- Daniel Ädel - vocals (2008-2016)
- Robert Luciani - vocals (2008-2011)

Live / session musicians

- Viggo Örsan - guitar (2025-present)
- Paul Seidel - drums (2026-present)
- Rasmus Hemse - bass (2012)

== Discography ==
Studio albums

- Måsstaden (2011)
- Måsstaden under vatten (2021)
- Där skogen sjunger under evighetens granar (2025)

EPs

- Thousands of Evils (2013)

Singles

- den helige anden (15 Nov 2019)
- när de du älskar kommer tillbaka från de döda (30 Apr 2021)
- toxin (20 Aug 2021)
- penny royal poison (17 Sep 2021)
- + den spanska känslan (15 Aug 2023)
- + ylva + (5 Oct 2023)
- + kristallfågel (25 Dec 2023)
- + sargasso + (7 Mar 2025)
- + ? regnet, the ? + (17 Apr 2025)

Demos

- Omnislash (2009)
