= Thall (music) =

Music genre

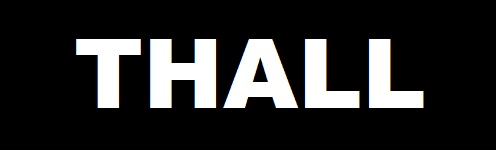
- A typical internet meme treatment of the word 'thall' in all-caps, c. 2015
- Etymology: Thrall, Warcraft series
- Stylistic origins: Progressive metal (Djent)
- Cultural origins: 2010s Swedish metal

Thall is a microgenre of progressive metal, considered adjacent to or a further subgenre of the subgenre djent. Stemming from an in-joke of the band Vildhjarta, the genre became a more definitive neologism after continued use by the band and other acts like Allt and Humanity's Last Breath in the 2020s, particularly by musician Buster Odeholm. The genre differs from djent in its heavy use of dissonance, pairing the distorted polyrhymic lead guitar typical to djent with clean guitar riffs and ambient sections.

== Etymology ==
'Thall' is like a word…a lifestyle, or could have been the title of the album. ... People keep asking us about it, but it’s just a word, thall. It can be whatever you want it to be.

— Calle Thomér, Vildhjarta frontman, c. 2012

Swedish progressive metal band Vildhjarta coined the protologism 'thall' c. 2011 as a tongue-in-cheek nonce word for the band's sonic tone and ethos. The word became a meme in metalhead circles following the 2011 album release Måsstaden. The word stems from a mispronunciation of the Warcraft video game series character Thrall in the band members' native Swedish accent.

== Description ==
Thall is frequently juxtaposed against its contemporary progressive metal subgenre djent. While the subgenres share an emphasis on polymeter and a highly distorted, downtuned guitar utilizing palm mutes (the eponymous 'djent' sound), thall differs in intensity - the guitar distortion is typically higher in thall - and in pairing the distorted guitar with moody, heavy-reverb guitar. The latter clean-tone guitar is used both for dissonant guitar riffs, as well as ambient background sections.

Thall features other dissonant techniques like pick scraping, and high-pitched guitar 'screams' facilitated by a whammy pedal.

== History ==
Similar to djent, thall's roots are in Swedish band Meshuggah and American nu metal band Korn. Frontman Calle Thomér has since described thall as "djent's colder younger brother". Vildhjarta's 2011 debut Måsstaden is retrospectively held as the foundational thall work.

Vildhjarta drummer and Humanity's Last Breath frontman Buster Odeholm has particularly defined thall as a subgenre separate from djent, using it to describe a perceived sonic trend in progressive metal. In 2024, Guitar World writer Phil Weller identified thall as a growing influence on wider progressive metal acts including Animals As Leaders, Sleep Token, and Spiritbox. In 2025, Odeholm released an audio plug-in, the 'Thall amp', designed to facilitate the production of thall guitar effects.

== List of thall bands ==
- Vildhjarta, 2005–
- Humanity's Last Breath, 2009–
- Allt, 2020–
