= Trans-Siberian Orchestra touring lineups =

The following is a list of Trans-Siberian Orchestra touring members, past and present. This list does not contain guest members.

== Winter 2026 ==
West	East
Al Pitrelli - Guitar, music director Angus Clark - Guitar; Jane Mangini - Keyboards; Jarrod Radnich - Keyboards; Johnny Lee Middleton - Bass; Blas Elias - Drums; Asha Mevlana - Violin; Phillip Brandon - Narrator; Andrew Ross - Vocals; Daniel Emmet - Vocals; Dustin Brayley - Vocals; Jeff Scott Soto - Vocals; Nate Amor - Vocals; April Berry - Vocals; Chloe Lowery - Vocals; Jodi Katz - Vocals; Moriah Formica - Vocals; Rosa Laricchiuta - Vocals	Chris Caffery - Guitar; Joel Hoekstra - Guitar; Mark Klett - Keyboards; Mee Eun Kim - Keyboards; Tony Dickinson - Bass; Jeff Plate - Drums; Roddy Chong - Violin; Bryan Hicks - Narrator; Caleb Johnson - Vocals; John Brink - Vocals; Robin Borneman - Vocals; Russell Allen - Vocals; Zachary "Zak" Stevens - Vocals; Danae Livieratou - Vocals; Gabbie Rae - Vocals; Georgia Napolitano - Vocals; Kayla Reeves - Vocals; Natalya Rose Piette - Vocals

== Winter 2025 ==
West	East
Al Pitrelli - Guitar, music director Angus Clark - Guitar; Mark Klett - Keyboards; Jane Mangini - Keyboards; Johnny Lee Middleton - Bass; Blas Elias - Drums; Asha Mevlana - Violin; Phillip Brandon - Narrator; Andrew Ross - Vocals; Daniel Emmet - Vocals; Dustin Brayley - Vocals; Jeff Scott Soto - Vocals; Nate Amor - Vocals; April Berry - Vocals; Chloe Lowery - Vocals; Jodi Katz - Vocals; Lorea Turner - Vocals; Rosa Laricchiuta - Vocals	Chris Caffery - Guitar; Joel Hoekstra - Guitar; Derek Wieland - Keyboards, music director Mee Eun Kim - Keyboards; Tony Dickinson - Bass; Jeff Plate - Drums; Roddy Chong - Violin; Bryan Hicks - Narrator; Caleb Johnson - Vocals; John Brink - Vocals; Robin Borneman - Vocals; Russell Allen - Vocals; Zachary "Zak" Stevens - Vocals; Gabbie Rae - Vocals; Georgia Napolitano - Vocals; Kayla Reeves - Vocals; Moriah Formica - Vocals; Natalya Rose Piette - Vocals

== Winter 2024 ==
West	East
Al Pitrelli - Guitar, music director Angus Clark - Guitar; Mark Klett - Keyboards; Jane Mangini - Keyboards; Johnny Lee Middleton - Bass; Blas Elias - Drums; Asha Mevlana - Violin; Phillip Brandon - Narrator; Andrew Ross - Vocals; Daniel Emmet - Vocals; Dustin Brayley - Vocals; Jeff Scott Soto - Vocals; Nate Amor - Vocals; April Berry - Vocals; Chloe Lowery - Vocals; Lorea Turner - Vocals; Moriah Formica - Vocals; Rosa Laricchiuta - Vocals	Chris Caffery - Guitar; Joel Hoekstra - Guitar; Derek Wieland - Keyboards, music director Mee Eun Kim - Keyboards; Tony Dickinson - Bass; Jeff Plate - Drums; Roddy Chong - Violin; Bryan Hicks - Narrator; Caleb Johnson - Vocals; John Brink - Vocals; Robin Borneman - Vocals; Russell Allen - Vocals; Zachary "Zak" Stevens - Vocals; Gabbie Rae - Vocals; Georgia Napolitano - Vocals; Kayla Reeves - Vocals; Kelsie Watts - Vocals; Natalya Rose Piette - Vocals

== Winter 2023 ==
West	East
Al Pitrelli - Guitar, music director Angus Clark - Guitar; Vitalij Kuprij - Keyboards; Jane Mangini - Keyboards; Johnny Lee Middleton - Bass; Blas Elias - Drums; Asha Mevlana - Violin; Phillip Brandon - Narrator; Andrew Ross - Vocals; Dustin Brayley - Vocals; Jeff Scott Soto - Vocals; Matt Laurent - Vocals; Nate Amor - Vocals; April Berry - Vocals; Chloe Lowery - Vocals; Jodi Katz - Vocals; Moriah Formica - Vocals; Rosa Laricchiuta - Vocals	Chris Caffery - Guitar; Joel Hoekstra - Guitar; Derek Wieland - Keyboards, music director Mee Eun Kim - Keyboards; Tony Dickinson - Bass; Jeff Plate - Drums; Roddy Chong - Violin; Bryan Hicks - Narrator; Caleb Johnson - Vocals; John Brink - Vocals; Robin Borneman - Vocals; Russell Allen - Vocals; Zachary "Zak" Stevens - Vocals; Gabbie Rae - Vocals; Gabriela Gunčíková - Vocals; Georgia Napolitano - Vocals; Kayla Reeves - Vocals; Mackenzie Meadows - Vocals; Natalya Rose Piette - Vocals

== Winter 2022 ==
West	East
Al Pitrelli - Guitar, music director Angus Clark - Guitar; Vitalij Kuprij - Keyboards; Jane Mangini - Keyboards; Johnny Lee Middleton - Bass; Blas Elias - Drums; Asha Mevlana - Violin; Phillip Brandon - Narrator; Dino Jelusic - Vocals; Nate Amor - Vocals; Jeff Scott Soto - Vocals; Andrew Ross - Vocals; Dustin Brayley - Vocals; Rosa Laricchiuta - Vocals; Moriah Formica - Vocals; April Berry - Vocals; Jodi Katz - Vocals; Chloe Lowery - Vocals	Chris Caffery - Guitar; Joel Hoekstra - Guitar; Derek Wieland - Keyboards, music director Mee Eun Kim - Keyboards; Tony Dickinson - Bass; Jeff Plate - Drums; Roddy Chong - Violin; Bryan Hicks - Narrator; Zachary "Zak" Stevens - Vocals; Russell Allen - Vocals; Robin Borneman - Vocals; John Brink - Vocals; Caleb Johnson - Vocals; Erika Jerry - Vocals; Gabbie Rae - Vocals; Georgia Napolitano - Vocals; Natalya Rose Piette - Vocals; Kayla Reeves - Vocals

== Winter 2021 ==
West	East
Al Pitrelli - Guitar, music director Angus Clark - Guitar; Vitalij Kuprij - Keyboards; Jane Mangini - Keyboards; Johnny Lee Middleton - Bass; Blas Elias - Drums; Asha Mevlana - Violin; Phillip Brandon - Narrator; Dino Jelusic - Vocals; Nate Amor - Vocals; Jeff Scott Soto - Vocals; Andrew Ross - Vocals; John Brink - Vocals; Rosa Laricchiuta - Vocals; Ashley Hollister - Vocals; April Berry - Vocals; Jodi Katz - Vocals; Chloe Lowery - Vocals	Chris Caffery - Guitar; Joel Hoekstra - Guitar; Derek Wieland - Keyboards, music director Mee Eun Kim - Keyboards; Tony Dickinson - Bass; Jeff Plate - Drums; Roddy Chong - Violin; Bryan Hicks - Narrator; Zachary "Zak" Stevens - Vocals; Russell Allen - Vocals; Robin Borneman - Vocals; Dustin Brayley - Vocals; Caleb Johnson - Vocals; Erika Jerry - Vocals; Gabbie Rae - Vocals; Georgia Napolitano - Vocals; Natalya Rose Piette - Vocals; Kayla Reeves - Vocals

== Winter 2020 ==
Livestream
Al Pitrelli - Guitar, music director

Chris Caffery - Guitar Johnny Lee Middleton - Bass Jeff Plate - Drums Derek Wieland - Keyboards, music director Mee Eun Kim - Keyboards Asha Mevlana - Violin Bryan Hicks - Narrator Russell Allen - Vocals Nate Amor - Vocals John Brink - Vocals Erika Jerry - Vocals Chloe Lowery - Vocals Georgia Napolitano - Vocals Jeff Scott Soto - Vocals

Only one show online due to the Covid-19 Pandemic.

== Winter 2019 ==
West	East
Al Pitrelli - Guitar, music director Angus Clark - Guitar; Vitalij Kuprij - Keyboards; Jane Mangini - Keyboards; Johnny Lee Middleton - Bass; Blas Elias - Drums; Asha Mevlana - Violin; Phillip Brandon - Narrator; Dino Jelusic - Vocals; Nate Amor - Vocals; Jeff Scott Soto - Vocals; Andrew Ross - Vocals; John Brink - Vocals; Rosa Laricchiuta - Vocals; Ashley Hollister - Vocals; April Berry - Vocals; Jodi Katz - Vocals; Chloe Lowery - Vocals	Chris Caffery - Guitar; Joel Hoekstra - Guitar; Derek Wieland - Keyboards, music director Mee Eun Kim - Keyboards; Tony Dickinson - Bass; Jeff Plate - Drums; Roddy Chong - Violin; Bryan Hicks - Narrator; Zachary "Zak" Stevens - Vocals; Russell Allen** - Vocals; Robin Borneman - Vocals; Dustin Brayley - Vocals; Caleb Johnson - Vocals; Erika Jerry - Vocals; Hayley Dorling - Vocals; Georgia Napolitano - Vocals; Natalya Rose Piette - Vocals; Kayla Reeves - Vocals

** Suffered back injury during rehearsals and had to miss tour

== Winter 2018 ==
West	East
Al Pitrelli - Guitar, music director Angus Clark - Guitar; Vitalij Kuprij - Keyboards; Jane Mangini - Keyboards; Johnny Lee Middleton - Bass; Blas Elias - Drums; Asha Mevlana - Violin; Phillip Brandon - Narrator; Dino Jelusic - Vocals; Mats Leven - Vocals; Rosa Larichiutta - Vocals; Ashley Hollister - Vocals; Jeff Scott Soto - Vocals; April Berry - Vocals; John Brink - Vocals; Jodi Katz - Vocals; Chloe Lowery - Vocals; Andrew Ross - Vocals	Chris Caffery - Guitar; Joel Hoekstra - Guitar; Derek Wieland - Keyboards, music director Mee Eun Kim - Keyboards; Tony Dickinson - Bass; Jeff Plate - Drums; Roddy Chong - Violin; Bryan Hicks - Narrator; Zachary "Zak" Stevens - Vocals; Russell Allen - Vocals; Robin Borneman - Vocals; Dustin Brayley - Vocals; Caleb Johnson - Vocals; Erika Jerry - Vocals; Lisa Lavie - Vocals; Georgia Napolitano - Vocals; Natalya Rose Piette - Vocals; Kayla Reeves - Vocals

== Winter 2017 ==
West	East
Al Pitrelli - Guitar, music director Angus Clark - Guitar; Vitalij Kuprij - Keyboards; Jane Mangini - Keyboards; Johnny Lee Middleton - Bass; Blas Elias - Drums; Asha Mevlana - Violin; Phillip Brandon - Narrator; Dino Jelusic - Vocals; Mats Leven - Vocals; Rosa Larichiutta - Vocals; Ashley Hollister - Vocals; Jeff Scott Soto - Vocals; April Berry - Vocals; John Brink - Vocals; Jodi Katz - Vocals; Chloe Lowery - Vocals; Andrew Ross - Vocals	Chris Caffery - Guitar; Joel Hoekstra - Guitar; Derek Wieland - Keyboards, music director Mee Eun Kim - Keyboards; Tony Dickinson - Bass; Jeff Plate - Drums; Roddy Chong - Violin; Bryan Hicks - Narrator; Zachary "Zak" Stevens - Vocals; Russell Allen - Vocals; Robin Borneman - Vocals; Dustin Brayley - Vocals; Rob Evan - Vocals; Ava Davis - Vocals; Lisa Lavie - Vocals; Georgia Napolitano - Vocals; Natalya Rose - Vocals; Kayla Reeves - Vocals

== Winter 2016 ==
West	East
Al Pitrelli - Guitar, music director Angus Clark - Guitar; Vitalij Kuprij - Keyboards; Jane Mangini - Keyboards; Johnny Lee Middleton - Bass; John O. Reilly - Drums; Asha Mevlana - Violin; Phillip Brandon - Narrator; Dino Jelusic - Vocals; Mats Leven - Vocals; Rosa Larichiutta - Vocals; Ashley Hollister - Vocals; Jeff Scott Soto - Vocals; April Berry - Vocals; John Brink - Vocals; Jodi Katz - Vocals; Chloe Lowery - Vocals; Andrew Ross - Vocals	Chris Caffery - Guitar; Joel Hoekstra - Guitar; Derek Wieland - Keyboards, music director Mee Eun Kim - Keyboards; David Zablidowsky - Bass; Jeff Plate - Drums; Roddy Chong - Violin; Bryan Hicks - Narrator; Zachary "Zak" Stevens - Vocals; Russell Allen - Vocals; Robin Borneman - Vocals; Dustin Brayley - Vocals; Rob Evan - Vocals; Autumn Guzzardi - Vocals; Lisa Lavie - Vocals; Georgia Napolitano - Vocals; Natalya Rose - Vocals; Kayla Reeves - Vocals

== Winter 2015 ==
West	East
Al Pitrelli - Guitar, music director Angus Clark - Guitar; Vitalij Kuprij - Keyboards; Jane Mangini - Keyboards; Johnny Lee Middleton - Bass; John O. Reilly - Drums; Asha Mevlana - Violin; Phillip Brandon - Narrator; Jeff Scott Soto - Vocals; April Berry - Vocals; John Brink - Vocals; Ava Davis - Vocals; Gabriela Gunčíková - Vocals; Joe Retta - Vocals; Jodi Katz - Vocals; Chloe Lowery - Vocals; Andrew Ross - Vocals; Bart Shatto - Vocals	Chris Caffery - Guitar; Bill Hudson - Guitar; Derek Wieland - Keyboards, music director Mee Eun Kim - Keyboards; David Zablidowsky - Bass; Jeff Plate - Drums; Roddy Chong - Violin; Bryan Hicks - Narrator; Zachary "Zak" Stevens - Vocals; Russell Allen - Vocals; Robin Borneman - Vocals; Dustin Brayley - Vocals; Rob Evan - Vocals; Autumn Guzzardi - Vocals; Lisa Lavie - Vocals; Georgia Napolitano - Vocals; Natalya Rose - Vocals; Kayla Reeves - Vocals

== Wacken 2015 ==
Black Stage (left, Savatage)	True Metal Stage (right, Trans-Siberian Orchestra)
Jon Oliva - Vocals, keyboards Vitalij Kuprij - Keyboards; Chris Caffery - Guitar; Bill Hudson - Guitar; Johnny Lee Middleton - Bass; Jeff Plate - Drums; Asha Mevlana - Violin; Zak Stevens - Vocals	Paul O'Neill - Guitar; Al Pitrelli - Guitar; Angus Clark - Guitar; David Zablidowsky - Bass; John O. Reilly - Drums; Roddy Chong - Violin; Jeff Scott Soto - Vocals; Russell Allen - Vocals; Andrew Ross - Vocals; Robin Borneman - Vocals; Nathan James - Vocals; Georgia Napolitano - Vocals; Chloe Lowery - Vocals; Derek Weiland - Keyboards; Mee Eun Kim - Keyboards

== Winter 2014 ==
West	East
Al Pitrelli - Guitar, music director Angus Clark - Guitar; Vitalij Kuprij - Keyboards; Jane Mangini - Keyboards; Johnny Lee Middleton - Bass; John O. Reilly - Drums; Asha Mevlana - Violin; Phillip Brandon - Narrator; April Berry - Vocals; John Brink - Vocals; Ava Davis - Vocals; Gabriela Gunčíková - Vocals; Nathan James - Vocals; Jodi Katz - Vocals; Chloe Lowery - Vocals; Andrew Ross - Vocals; Bart Shatto - Vocals; Jeff Scott Soto - Vocals	Chris Caffery - Guitar; Joel Hoekstra - Guitar; Derek Wieland - Keyboards, music director Mee Eun Kim - Keyboards; David Zablidowsky - Bass; Jeff Plate - Drums; Roddy Chong - Violin; Bryan Hicks - Narrator; Russell Allen - Vocals; Robin Borneman - Vocals; Dustin Brayley - Vocals; Rob Evan - Vocals; Autumn Guzzardi - Vocals; Lisa Lavie - Vocals; Georgia Napolitano - Vocals; Natalya Piette - Vocals; Kayla Reeves - Vocals

== Europe 2014 ==
Chris Caffery - Guitar
Al Pitrelli - Guitar, music director
Johnny Lee Middleton - Bass
Jeff Plate - Drums
Asha Mevlana - Violin
Vitalij Kuprij - Keyboards
Mee Eun Kim - Keyboards
Bryan Hicks - Narrator
Jeff Scott Soto - Vocals
Chloe Lowery - Vocals
Kayla Reeves - Vocals
Autumn Guzzardi - Vocals
Natalya Piette - Vocals
Rob Evan - Vocals
Nathan James - Vocals
Robin Borneman - Vocals
Erika Jerry - Vocals
Andrew Ross - Vocals, Guitar
Paul O'Neill - Guitar (selected shows only)

== Winter 2013 ==
West	East
Al Pitrelli - Guitar, music director Angus Clark - Guitar; Vitalij Kuprij - Keyboards; Jane Mangini - Keyboards; Johnny Lee Middleton - Bass; John O. Reilly - Drums; Asha Mevlana - Violin; Phillip Brandon - Narrator; April Berry - Vocals; John Brink - Vocals; Ava Davis - Vocals; Nathan James - Vocals; Jodi Katz - Vocals; Chloe Lowery - Vocals; Andrew Ross - Vocals; Jeff Scott Soto - Vocals	Chris Caffery - Guitar; Joel Hoekstra - Guitar; Derek Wieland - Keyboards, music director Luci Butler - Keyboards; David Zablidowsky - Bass; Jeff Plate - Drums; Roddy Chong - Violin; Bryan Hicks - Narrator; Russell Allen - Vocals; Robin Borneman - Vocals; Dustin Brayley - Vocals; Rob Evan - Vocals; Autumn Guzzardi - Vocals; Erika Jerry - Vocals; Georgia Napolitano - Vocals; Natalya Piette - Vocals; Kayla Reeves - Vocals

== Winter 2012 ==
West	East
Al Pitrelli - Guitar, music director Angus Clark - Guitar; Vitalij Kuprij - Keyboards; Jane Mangini - Keyboards; Johnny Lee Middleton - Bass; John O. Reilly - Drums; Asha Mevlana - Violin; Phillip Brandon - Narrator; April Berry - Vocals; Dustin Brayley - Vocals; Ava Davis - Vocals; Nathan James - Vocals; Jodi Katz - Vocals; Chloe Lowery - Vocals; Dari Mahnic - Vocals; Andrew Ross - Vocals; Jeff Scott Soto - Vocals	Chris Caffery - Guitar; Joel Hoekstra - Guitar; Derek Wieland - Keyboards, music director Luci Butler - Keyboards; David Zablidowsky - Bass; Jeff Plate - Drums; Roddy Chong - Violin; Bryan Hicks - Narrator; Rob Evan - Vocals; Autumn Guzzardi - Vocals; Erika Jerry - Vocals; James Lewis - Vocals; Georgia Napolitano - Vocals; Jay Pierce - Vocals; Natalya Piette - Vocals; Chris Pinnella - Vocals; Kayla Reeves - Vocals

== Spring 2012 - Beethoven's Last Night ==
Chris Caffery - Guitar
Al Pitrelli - Guitar
Johnny Lee Middleton - Bass
Jeff Plate - Drums
Roddy Chong - Violin
Vitalij Kuprij - Keyboards
Mee Eun Kim - Keyboards
Bryan Hicks - Narrator
Rob Evan - Vocals (Beethoven)
Andrew Ross - Vocals (Twist)
Ronny Munroe - Vocals (Mephistoteles)
Chris Pinnella - Vocals (young Beethoven)
Chloe Lowery - Vocals (Theresa)
Georgia Napolitano - Vocals (Fate)
Natalya Rose - Vocals
April Berry - Vocals
Kayla Reeves - Vocals

== Winter 2011 ==
West	East
Al Pitrelli - Guitar, music director Angus Clark - Guitar; Vitalij Kuprij - Keyboards; Jane Mangini - Keyboards; Johnny Lee Middleton - Bass; John O. Reilly - Drums; Asha Mevlana - Violin; Phillip Brandon - Narrator; Jodi Katz - Vocals; Chloe Lowery - Vocals; Andrew Ross - Vocals; Bart Shatto - Vocals; Jeff Scott Soto - Vocals; Dari Mahnic - Vocals; April Berry - Vocals; Becca Tobin - Vocals	Chris Caffery - Guitar; Joel Hoekstra - Guitar; Derek Wieland - Keyboards, music director Luci Butler - Keyboards; David Z - Bass; Jeff Plate - Drums; Roddy Chong - Violin; Bryan Hicks - Narrator; John Brink - Vocals; Ashley Adamek - Vocals; Ronny Munroe - Vocals; Erika Jerry - Vocals; James Lewis - Vocals; Georgia Napolitano - Vocals; Natalya Piette - Vocals; Kayla Reeves - Vocals

== Europe 2011 ==
Chris Caffery - Guitar
Al Pitrelli - Guitar
Johnny Lee Middleton - Bass
Jeff Plate - Drums
Roddy Chong - Violin
Vitalij Kuprij - Keyboards
Mee Eun Kim - Keyboards
Bryan Hicks - Narrator
Rob Evan - Vocals
Andrew Ross - Vocals
Jeff Scott Soto - Vocals
Georgia Napolitano - Vocals
Kayla Reeves - Vocals
Chloe Lowery - Vocals
Paul O'Neill - Guitar (selected shows only)

== Winter 2010 ==
West	East
Al Pitrelli - Guitar, music director Angus Clark - Guitar; Vitalij Kuprij - Keyboards; Jane Mangini - Keyboards; Johnny Lee Middleton - Bass; John O. Reilly - Drums; Caitlin Moe - Violin; Phillip Brandon - Narrator; Tru Collins - Vocals; Kristin Gorman - Vocals; Andrew Ross - Vocals; Bart Shatto - Vocals; Jeff Scott Soto - Vocals; Tommy Farese - Vocals; Erin Henry - Vocals	Chris Caffery - Guitar; Joel Hoekstra - Guitar; Derek Wieland - Keyboards, music director Luci Butler - Keyboards; David Z - Bass; Jeff Plate - Drums; Roddy Chong - Violin; Bryan Hicks - Narrator; John Brink - Vocals; Autumn Guzzardi - Vocals; Tim Hockenberry - Vocals; Erika Jerry - Vocals; James Lewis - Vocals; Georgia Napolitano - Vocals; Jay Pierce - Vocals; Natalya Piette - Vocals; Kayla Reeves - Vocals; Jason Wooten - Vocals

== Winter 2009 ==
West	East
Al Pitrelli - Guitar, music director Angus Clark - Guitar; Chris Altenhoff - Bass; Jane Mangini - Keyboards; Derek Wieland - Keyboards; Roddy Chong - Violin; John O. Reilly - Drums; April Berry - Vocals; Theodore Cruz - Vocals; Mike Elio - Vocals; Tommy Farese - Vocals; Tony Gaynor - Narrator; Kristin Gorman - Vocals; Erin Henry - Vocals; Katie Hicks - Vocals; Edwin Mendoza - Vocals; Caitlin Moe - Violin; Abby Lynn Mulay - Vocals; Andrew Ross - Vocals; Bart Shatto - Vocals; Jeff Scott Soto - Vocals	Chris Caffery - Guitar; Alex Skolnick - Guitar; Robert Kinkel - Keyboards, music director Luci Butler - Keyboards; Johnny Lee Middleton - Bass; Anna Phoebe - Violin; Jeff Plate - Drums; Bryan Hicks - Narrator; Steve Broderick - Vocals; Rob Evan - Vocals; Alexa Goddard - Vocals; Tim Hockenberry - Vocals; Jodi Katz - Vocals; Danielle Landherr - Vocals; James Lewis - Vocals; Jay Pierce - Vocals; Valentina Porter - Vocals

== Winter 2008 ==
West	East
Al Pitrelli - Guitar, music director Angus Clark - Guitar; Derek Wieland - Keyboards; Jane Mangini - Keyboards; Chris Altenhoff - Bass; John O'Reilly - Drums; Mark Wood - Violin; Alison Zlotow - Violin; Anthony Gaynor - Narrator; Tommy Farese - Vocals; Scout Ford - Vocals; Christie George - Vocals; Kristen Gorman - Vocals; Erin Henry - Vocals; Steena Hernandez - Vocals; Andrew Ross - Vocals; Bart Shatto - Vocals; Jeff Scott Soto - Vocals	Chris Caffery - Guitar; Alex Skolnick - Guitar; Bob Kinkel - Keyboards, music director Luci Butler - Keyboards; Johnny Lee Middleton - Bass; Jeff Plate - Drums; Anna Phoebe - Violin; Bryan Hicks - Narrator; Steve Broderick - Vocals; Roddy Chong - Violin; Jamey Garner - Vocals; Alexa Goddard - Vocals; Tim Hockenberry - Vocals; Danielle Landherr - Vocals; James Lewis - Vocals; Jay Pierce - Vocals; Kelly Valentina Porter - Vocals; Adrienne Warren - Vocals
