= Letters from the Labyrinth =

Studio album by Trans-Siberian Orchestra
- Released: November 13, 2015
- Genre: Symphonic metal; progressive metal; neoclassical metal
- Length: 52:08
- Label: Republic Records
- Producer: Paul O'Neill; Dave Wittman

Trans-Siberian Orchestra chronology
Dreams of Fireflies (2013)	Letters from the Labyrinth (2015)

Letters from the Labyrinth is the sixth studio album by the Trans-Siberian Orchestra. It was released on November 13, 2015. The album is a collection of songs and stories. The stories being a nod to their previous full album Night Castle, using the stories written by the protagonist. The album reached #7 on the Billboard 200 album chart and #1 on the Billboard Top Rock Albums chart. This album was the last for TSO members Paul O'Neill, David Zablidowsky, and Vitalij Kuprij before their deaths. O’Neill and Zablidowsky died in 2017, and Kuprij died in 2024.

== Critical reception ==
Professional ratings
Review scores
Source	Rating
CCM Magazine	4/5 stars
Omaha World-Herald	2/4 stars
Grande Rock	4.5/10 stars

Awarding the album four stars at CCM Magazine, Matt Conner states, "Indeed, it’s a tall order to educate, enlighten and entertain all at the same time, but TSO effortlessly passes the test, and in the process, turns in one of its most ambitious and gratifying works to date." Kevin Coffey, giving the album two stars out of four from Omaha World-Herald, writes, "It’s amazing and technical playing that’s sure to impress any fan of precise progressive rock. But it’s also a little tedious. All those ever-present solos and precise melodies kind of blend together song after song. And I question why studio recordings would have so many synthesizers replicating strings and grand pianos when surely, with this band as successful as it is, they could have used real musicians. According to the liner notes, they did, but it’s hard to pick out the real players from the synthesized sections. The best performance on the record comes from Halestorm lead singer Lzzy Hale, who sings on a version of “Forget About the Blame.” Unfortunately, her talents are wasted on an extremely repetitive metal ballad. Your enjoyment of this album will probably depend on your overall enjoyment of the band in general...If you dig their rock opera style and hair metal music, you’ll be into this...But don’t buy this looking for another Christmas favorite." Rockavlon awarded the album 4.5 stars out of 10 from Grande-Rock.com, writes, "A half-baked attempt at music theater by stitching together a lot of classical pieces and writing some rather uneventful in between parts to create a semblance of a plot… I’d rather listen to the original classics."

== Track listing ==
No.	Title	Writer(s)	Vocals	Length
1.	"Time and Distance (The Dash)"	Wolfgang Amadeus Mozart, Paul O'Neill, Jon Oliva		3:44
2.	"Madness of Men" (instrumental)	Ludwig van Beethoven, Paul O'Neill, Jon Oliva		4:10
3.	"Prometheus"	Ludwig van Beethoven, Paul O'Neill, Jon Oliva	Jeff Scott Soto	3:39
4.	"Mountain Labyrinth" (instrumental)	Modest Mussorgsky, Paul O'Neill		3:15
5.	"King Rurik" (instrumental)	Paul O'Neill, Vitalij Kuprij		3:11
6.	"Prince Igor" (instrumental)	Nikolai Rimsky-Korsakov, Alexander Borodin, Alexander Glazunov, Paul O'Neill, Jon Oliva		3:04
7.	"The Night Conceives"	Paul O'Neill, Jon Oliva	Kayla Reeves	3:38
8.	"Forget About the Blame (Sun Version)" (Johnny Green remake)	Johnny Green	Robin Borneman	4:15
9.	"Not Dead Yet"	Paul O'Neill, Jon Oliva	Russell Allen	3:28
10.	"Past Tomorrow"	Paul O'Neill, Jon Oliva	Jennifer Cella	3:20
11.	"Stay" (Savatage remake)	Paul O'Neill, Jon Oliva	Adrienne Warren	2:57
12.	"Not the Same"	Paul O'Neill, Ireland O'Neill	Kayla Reeves	3:41
13.	"Who I Am"	Paul O'Neill		2:49
14.	"Lullaby Night" (instrumental)	Johann Sebastian Bach, Paul O'Neill		2:44
15.	"Forget About the Blame" (Moon Version)" (Johnny Green remake)	Johnny Green	Lzzy Hale	4:16
16.	"A Mad Russian's Christmas (Live)" (Amazon Bonus Track)	Paul O'Neill		3:58
Total length:				56:20

== Personnel ==
- Paul O'Neill - producer
- Dave Wittman - co-producer, recording & mix engineer
- BJ Ramone - assistant engineer
- Jon Tucker - additional assistant engineer
- A&R - Jason Flom, Ryan Silva

=== Performers ===
==== Band ====
- Paul O'Neill - guitars
- Jon Oliva - keyboards, guitars, bass
- Al Pitrelli - lead/rhythm guitars
- Luci Butler - keyboards
- Chris Caffery - guitars
- Roddy Chong - violin
- Angus Clark - guitars
- Mee Eun Kim - keyboards
- Vitalij Kuprij - keyboards
- Jane Mangini - keyboards
- Derek Weiland - keyboards
- Asha Mevlana - violin
- Johnny Lee Middleton - bass
- John O. Reilly - drums
- Jeff Plate - drums
- David Zablidowsky - bass
- Dave Wittman - additional guitar, bass, drums

==== Background vocals ====
- "Forget About the Blame" - Lucille Jacobs, Minnie W. Leonard, Keith Jacobs
- "Who I Am" - Danielle Sample, Erika Jerry, Chloe Lowery, Dari Mahnic, Bart Shatto, Andrew Ross, John Brink, Natalya Piette, Jodi Katz, James Lewis, Georgia Napolitano, Tim Hockenberry
- "Time and Distance (The Dash)" - Danielle Sample, Chloe Lowery, Ava Davis, Kayla Reeves, Adrienne Warren, Andrew Ross, Chris Pinnella, Rob Evan, Parker Sipes, Phillip Brandon, Dustin Brayley, April Berry, Autumn Guzzardi

==== Strings ====
- Roddy Chong
- Asha Mevlana
- Lowell Adams
- Nancy Chang
- Lei Liu

==== Horns ====
- Jon Tucker (leader)
- Kenneth Brantley
- Jay Coble
- Ashby Wilkins

== Charts ==
=== Weekly charts ===
Chart (2015)	Peak position
Canadian Albums (Billboard)	15
US Billboard 200	7
US Top Rock Albums (Billboard)	1

=== Year-end charts ===
Chart (2016)	Position
US Billboard 200	196
US Top Rock Albums (Billboard)	17
