= Tari =

Tari may refer to:

== Places ==
- Tari, Papua New Guinea, a town in the Hela Province of Papua New Guinea
- Tari Urban LLG, a local-level government area of Papua New Guinea
- Tari, Siliguri, a census town in Dajeeling district, West Bengal, India
- Tari Airport, Papua New Guinea
- El Tari Airport, Indonesia

== People ==
- Odetari, American rapper and singer
- Tari (name)
- Tari (Kashmiri tribe), a Kashmiri tribe and family name in India and Pakistan

== Other uses ==
- Tarì, a coin minted in Sicily, Malta and south Italy from about 913 to 1859
- Tari, the protagonist of the animated science-fiction web series Meta Runner
- Taiwan Agricultural Research institute (TARI), an agricultural research institute in Taiwan

== See also ==
- Tari Tari, a 2012 Japanese anime television series
- Tary (disambiguation)
- Thari (disambiguation)
