= So There (disambiguation) =

So There may refer to

- So There (Ben Folds album), an album by Ben Folds
  - "So There", a song by Ben Folds off the eponymous album So There
- So There, album by Steve Swallow
- "So There", song by Alexa Goddard

== See also ==
- There (disambiguation)
- So (disambiguation)
