= Thar =

Thar may refer to:

- Thar Desert, or the Great Indian Desert and Marusthal, large desert in northwestern India and Pakistan, constituting the major part of the Indian state of Rajasthan
- Thar (Sindh), a region in eastern Sindh
  - Marusthali, a region of Rajasthan, India in the Thar Desert
  - Tharparkar (disambiguation), a district in Sindh, Pakistan
  - Mahindra Thar, a subcompact four-wheel drive sport utility vehicle (SUV), named after the desert
  - Thar (film), a 2022 Indian Hindi-language Western thriller set in the Thar Desert in Rajasthan
- Himalayan tahr (Hemitragus jemlahicus), an ungulate, also known as thar
- Thar language, a language spoken by the Bede people of Bangladesh and East India

== See also ==
- Thari (disambiguation)
- Thal (disambiguation), thal or thar are generic term for deserts in Indic languages
  - Thal Desert, a distinct desert in Punjab, Pakistan
  - Thali (disambiguation)
- Tharu (disambiguation)
- There (disambiguation)
- Maru (disambiguation), a generic term for sand and desert in Indic languages
  - Maru (surname), an Indian surname
- Marwari (disambiguation), terms related to the Marwar region in Rajasthan, India in the Thar Desert
- Cholistani (disambiguation), terms related to the Cholistan Desert in Punjab, Pakistan, a subpart of the Thar Desert
