= Tary =

Tary may refer to:

== People ==
- Gizella Tary (1884–1960), Hungarian fencer
- Tibor Tary (1909–1945), Hungarian sports shooter

== Places ==
- Tary, Volgograd Oblast, Russia
- Ust-Tary, Perm Krai, Russia

== See also ==
- Tari (disambiguation)
