= Cholistani =

Cholistani refers to something related to the Cholistan Desert of Punjab, Pakistan, a part of the Thar Desert.

In particular, Cholistani may refer to:

- Cholistani (cattle)
- Cholistani (sheep)

== See also ==
- Thar (disambiguation)
