= Tharparkar (disambiguation) =

Tharparkar, formerly Thar and Parkar, is a district in Sindh, Pakistan.

Tharparkar may also refer to:

- Tharparkar cattle, a type of cattle.

== See also ==
- Thar (disambiguation)
- Thari (disambiguation)
