= Rana Tharu =

Rana Tharu may refer to:

- Rana Tharu, an ethnic group generally classified as part of the Tharu people of Nepal and India
- Rana Tharu language, their language

== See also ==
- Rana (disambiguation)
- Tharu (disambiguation)
- Puran Rana Tharu, Nepalese politician
