= Dreams of Fireflies =

Dreams of Fireflies (On a Christmas Night)

EP by Trans-Siberian Orchestra
- Released: October 30, 2012
- Genre: Christmas music; classical music; progressive rock; symphonic metal
- Length: 15:28
- Label: Lava Records
- Producer: Paul O'Neill

Trans-Siberian Orchestra chronology
| Night Castle (2009) | Dreams of Fireflies (On a Christmas Night) (2012) | Letters from the Labyrinth (2015) |

Dreams of Fireflies (On a Christmas Night) is an EP by the rock band Trans-Siberian Orchestra. It was released in 2012 on Lava Records, and is based on the fourth movement (Winter) of Vivaldi's Four Seasons.

== Commercial performance ==
The album debuted at No. 9 on the Billboard 200 albums chart on its first week of release, selling around 31,000 copies in the United States in its first week. It also debuted at No. 3 on Billboard's Rock Albums chart, No. 1 on the Hard Rock Albums chart, as well as No. 2 on the Top Holiday Albums chart. As of October 2015, the album has sold 344,000 copies in the US.

== Track listing ==
| No. | Title | Writer(s) | Length |
|---|---|---|---|
| 1. | "Winter Palace (Instrumental)" | Paul O'Neill | 3:39 |
| 2. | "Dreams of Fireflies (On a Christmas Night) (Instrumental)" | Antonio Lucio Vivaldi (The Four Seasons Concerto No. 4 in F minor, Op. 8, RV 297, "L'inverno" (Winter)), Wolfgang Amadeus Mozart (The Magic Flute), Paul O'Neill | 2:30 |
| 3. | "I Had a Memory" | Paul O'Neill | 3:00 |
| 4. | "Someday" | Paul O'Neill | 3:43 |
| 5. | "Time You Should Be Sleeping" | Paul O'Neill, Robert Kinkel, Jon Oliva | 2:36 |

== Personnel ==
Trans-Siberian Orchestra

- Paul O'Neill – guitars
- Jon Oliva – keyboards
- Al Pitrelli – lead guitar, rhythm guitar
- Chris Caffery – guitars
- Roddy Chong – violin
- Angus Clark – guitars
- Joel Hoekstra – guitars
- Mee Eun Kim – keyboards
- Vitalij Kuprij – keyboards
- Jane Mangini – keyboards
- Johnny Lee Middleton – bass guitar
- John O'Reilly – drums
- Jeff Plate – drums
- Derek Wieland – keyboards
- David Zablidowsky – bass
- Dave Wittman – drums, guitar & bass inserts
- Erika Jerry – lead vocals on "I Had A Memory"
- Tim Hockenberry – lead vocals on "Someday"
- Georgia Napolitano – lead vocals on "Time You Should Be Sleeping (Christmas Lullaby)"

Production

- Paul O'Neill – producer

== Charts ==
=== Weekly charts ===
| Chart (2012) | Peak position |
|---|---|
| US Billboard 200 | 9 |
| US Top Holiday Albums (Billboard) | 2 |
| US Top Rock Albums (Billboard) | 3 |

=== Year-end charts ===
| Chart (2013) | Position |
|---|---|
| US Billboard 200 | 148 |
| US Top Rock Albums (Billboard) | 37 |
