= Tharu =

Tharu may refer to:

- Tharu people, an ethnic group of Nepal and India
- Tharu languages, the group of related languages spoken by them
  - Tharu cinema, cinema in the Tharu language
- Tjaru or Tharu, an ancient Egyptian fortress
- Volkswagen Tharu, a sport utility vehicle model
- Tharu purana, village in Larkana District, Sindh, Pakistan

== Persons with the name ==
- Bishnu Prasad Chaudhari Tharu, a Nepalese politician
- Indrajit Tharu, a Nepalese politician
- Mangal Prasad Tharu, a Nepalese politician
- Puran Rana Tharu, a Nepalese politician
- Ramcharan Chaudhari (Tharu), a Nepalese politician
- Sant Kumar Tharu, a Nepalese politician
- Susie Tharu, Indian writer

== See also ==
- Rana Tharu (disambiguation)
- Kochila Tharu
- Thar (disambiguation)
