= KeyBank Center =

Multipurpose indoor arena in Buffalo, New York

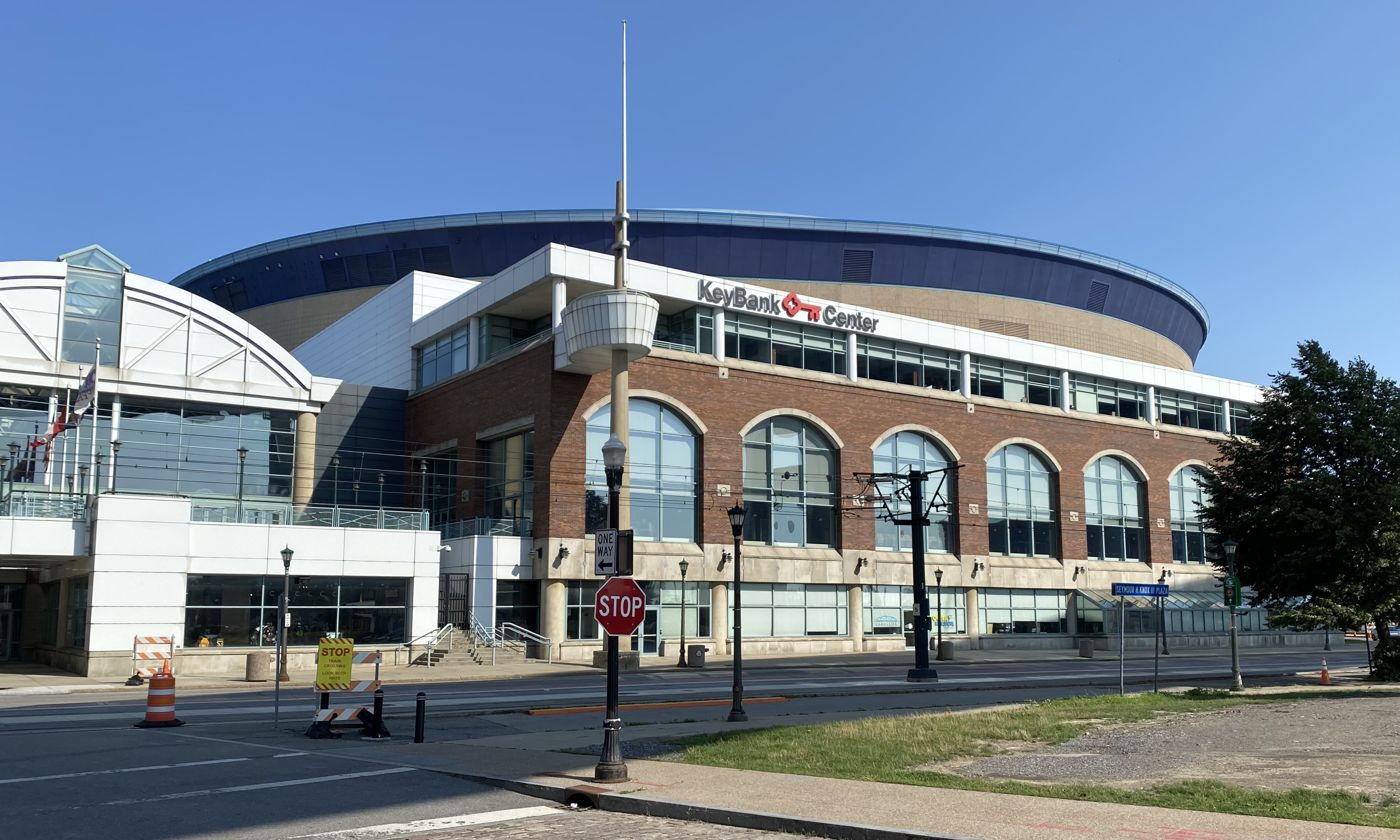
- KeyBank Center in 2021
- Interactive map of KeyBank Center
- Former names: Marine Midland Arena (1996–2000); HSBC Arena (2000–2011); First Niagara Center (2011–2016)
- Address: 1 Seymour H. Knox III Plaza
- Location: Buffalo, New York, U.S.
- Coordinates: 42°52′30″N 78°52′35″W
- Owner: Erie County (lands owned by the City of Buffalo)
- Operator: Buffalo Sabres
- Capacity: Basketball: 19,070; Concerts: 18,500; Ice hockey/Lacrosse: 18,595 (1996–1999); 18,690 (1999–2013); 19,070 (2013–present); Wrestling: 16,597
- Field size: 700,000 sq ft (65,000 m^{2})
- Public transit: DL&W

Construction
- Groundbreaking: November 4, 1994
- Opened: September 21, 1996
- Cost: $127.5 million ($262 million in 2025 dollars)
- Architects: Ellerbe Becket; Bergmann Associates PC
- General contractor: Huber, Hunt & Nichols

Tenants
- Buffalo Sabres (NHL) 1996–present Buffalo Blizzard (NPSL) 1996–2001; Buffalo Wings (RHI) 1997; Buffalo Bandits (NLL) 1997–present Buffalo Destroyers (AFL) 1999–2003

Website
- keybankcenter.com

KeyBank Center is a multi-purpose indoor arena located in Buffalo, New York, United States. Originally known as Marine Midland Arena, the venue has since been named HSBC Arena and First Niagara Center. Home to the Buffalo Sabres of the National Hockey League (NHL) since 1996, it is the largest indoor arena in Western New York, seating 19,070. The venue is also home to the Buffalo Bandits of the National Lacrosse League.

Since 2015, the KeyBank Center has hosted the annual NHL draft combine alongside the Harborcenter. In addition to hockey events, concerts, and professional wrestling, the venue has hosted the NCAA Division I men's basketball tournament several times.

KeyBank Center was previously home to the Canisius Golden Griffins (NCAA), Buffalo Blizzard (NPSL), Buffalo Wings (RHI) and Buffalo Destroyers (AFL).

== History ==
=== Planning and construction ===
What was originally known during construction as Crossroads Arena opened September 21, 1996, replacing Buffalo Memorial Auditorium. The construction cost was $127.5 million, (approximately $262 million in 2025 dollars). The arena replaced the Sabres' former home, Buffalo Memorial Auditorium, where the team played from 1970 to 1996.

The venue was named after its central downtown location, which was originally proposed as the site of a domed stadium in the 1960s for the Buffalo Bills and a potential Major League Baseball team before that project was abandoned.

=== Opening and reception ===
On November 16, 1996, the arena's first JumboTron, an eight-sided scoreboard made by Daktronics with Sony video screens, fell to the ice while it was being remotely moved. This happened minutes after a few players ended practice and hours before a game between the Buffalo Sabres and Boston Bruins. Nobody was injured, but the game was postponed. The scoreboard was replaced later that season.

=== Alterations ===
The first update to the arena took place after the conclusion of the 1998-1999 hockey season. 95 seats were added behind the last row of the 300 level, raising the arena's hockey and lacrosse capacity from 18,595 to 18,690.

The second update to the arena took place in 2002–2003, when the Sabres replaced matrix board on the face of the second bowl with a LED ribbon. The original seamless glass boards were also removed, and replaced with boards with clear plastic stanchions, which gave when players were hit into them.

The third update to the arena took place prior to the 2007–2008 season. Two illuminated Sabres logos were added in the upper level of the pavilion on both sides of the Sports Headlines bar. Also, new LED ribbon boards were installed in the arena seating bowl in conjunction with the new HD scoreboard manufactured by Daktronics. In addition, the four main speaker racks were removed and replaced and two additional speaker racks were added. The new scoreboard features four large HD video screens, surrounded by two 360-degree LED ribbon boards. The bottom of the board features large Buffalo Sabres logos with giant sabres crossed behind them. The handles of the sabres are lit with blue LEDs. The Sabres logos shoot smoke out of the Buffalo's nostrils every time a Sabres goal is scored or when the Sabres win at home. Later in 2008, a mural was installed in the lower pavilion near the main entrance, containing pictures from the 2008 NHL Winter Classic held at Ralph Wilson Stadium, now known as Highmark Stadium, in nearby Orchard Park.

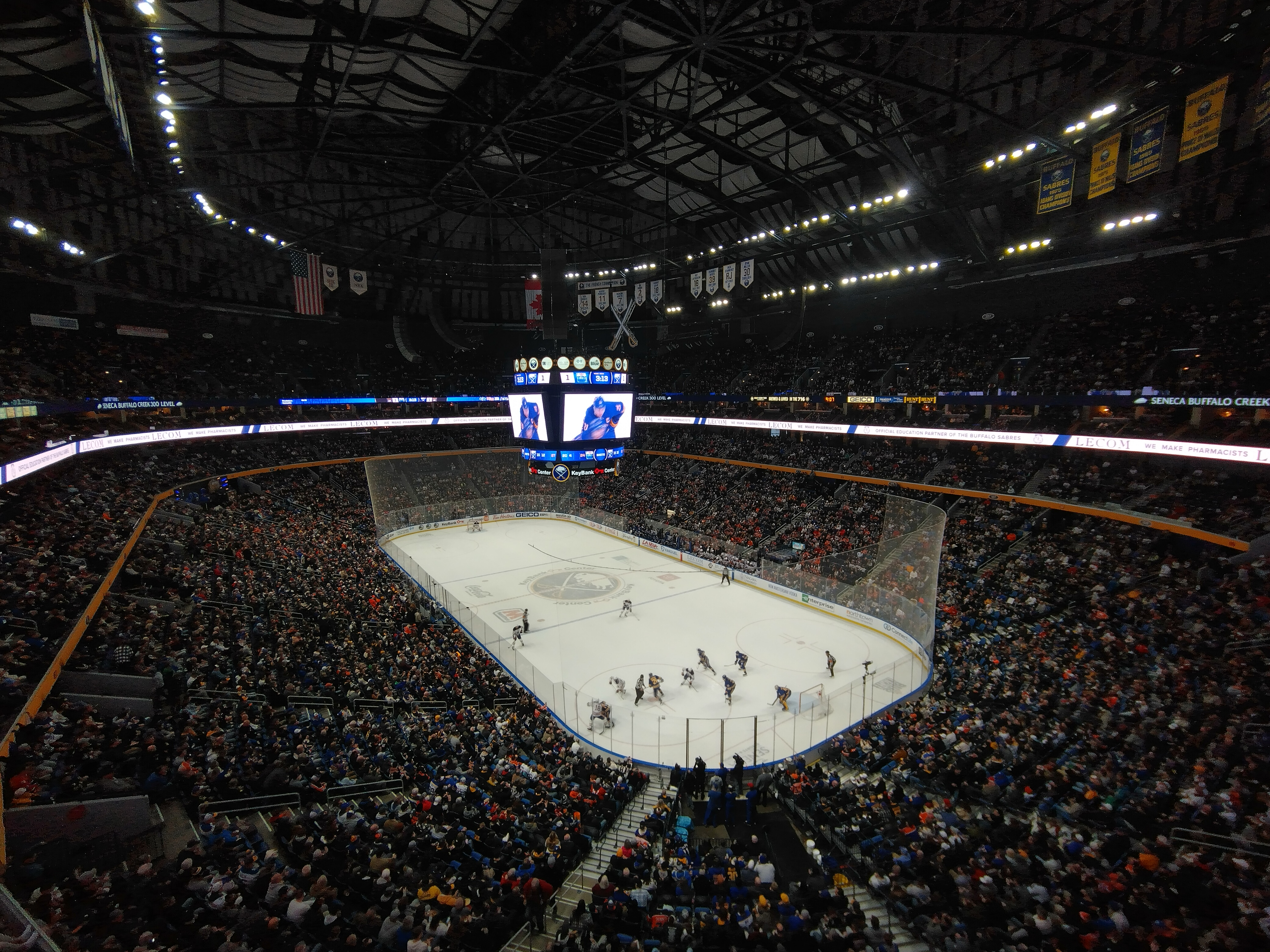
The venue's interior during a Buffalo Sabres game, March 2023

The fourth update took place during the summer and early fall of 2011. The major renovation included the demolition and installation of brand new locker rooms, decor and concession updates as well as fan enhancements. This $6 million locker room project led by Cannon Design of Grand Island saw an expansion from 8,000 to 15,220 square feet (743 to 1,414 m^{2}) in size. The new Sabres locker room is designed as a circular room, complete with illuminated team logos on the floor and ceiling. Additional new facilities include a state of the art fitness center, new coaching offices, film rooms where players and coaches can watch previous games, and a players lounge with a kitchen and team chef. Also, the new Sabres locker room features a Wall of Fame featuring team history, the names and numbers of retired team jerseys. Limestones that were salvaged from the former Buffalo Memorial Auditorium are surrounded by glass, which features the names of all team players throughout franchise existence. Visiting team locker rooms were also expanded from 3,230 to 3,511 square feet (300.1 to 326.2 m^{2}). Finally, a new post-game interview room was also built. In addition to the new locker rooms and training facilities, the public spaces within the arena were also upgraded.

Also as part of the update, the arena took on the Sabres Blue and Gold color scheme inside the arena bowl. It replaced the red color used on the team logo from 1996 to 2006. The previous Sabres logo (known as the "Buffaslug", and used from 2006 to 2010) was removed from the scoreboard and replaced with the current logo. All of the original TV sets were replaced with new HDTVs. New food choices were added as part of the upgraded concessions. Signage was replaced or upgraded where needed. Restrooms saw cup holders and HDTVs added for fan convenience. Also, new chimes were added, which sound two minutes prior to the opening faceoff each period. This lets fans know to head towards the seating areas. Finally, the Sports Headlines bar has now been replaced by the Labatt Blue Zone.

The ice rink itself also saw a multimillion-dollar upgrade with adding a new dehumidifier system and cooling tower. All of the Zamboni machines were replaced and upgraded to feature laser beam leveling. These upgrades improve the quality of the ice surface. Outside, a new LED ribbon board was added to the entrance pavilion which can display upcoming events, scores, and team information, though it was subsequently removed to make way for the construction of a new pedestrian bridge to the adjacent LECOM Harborcenter complex in 2014.

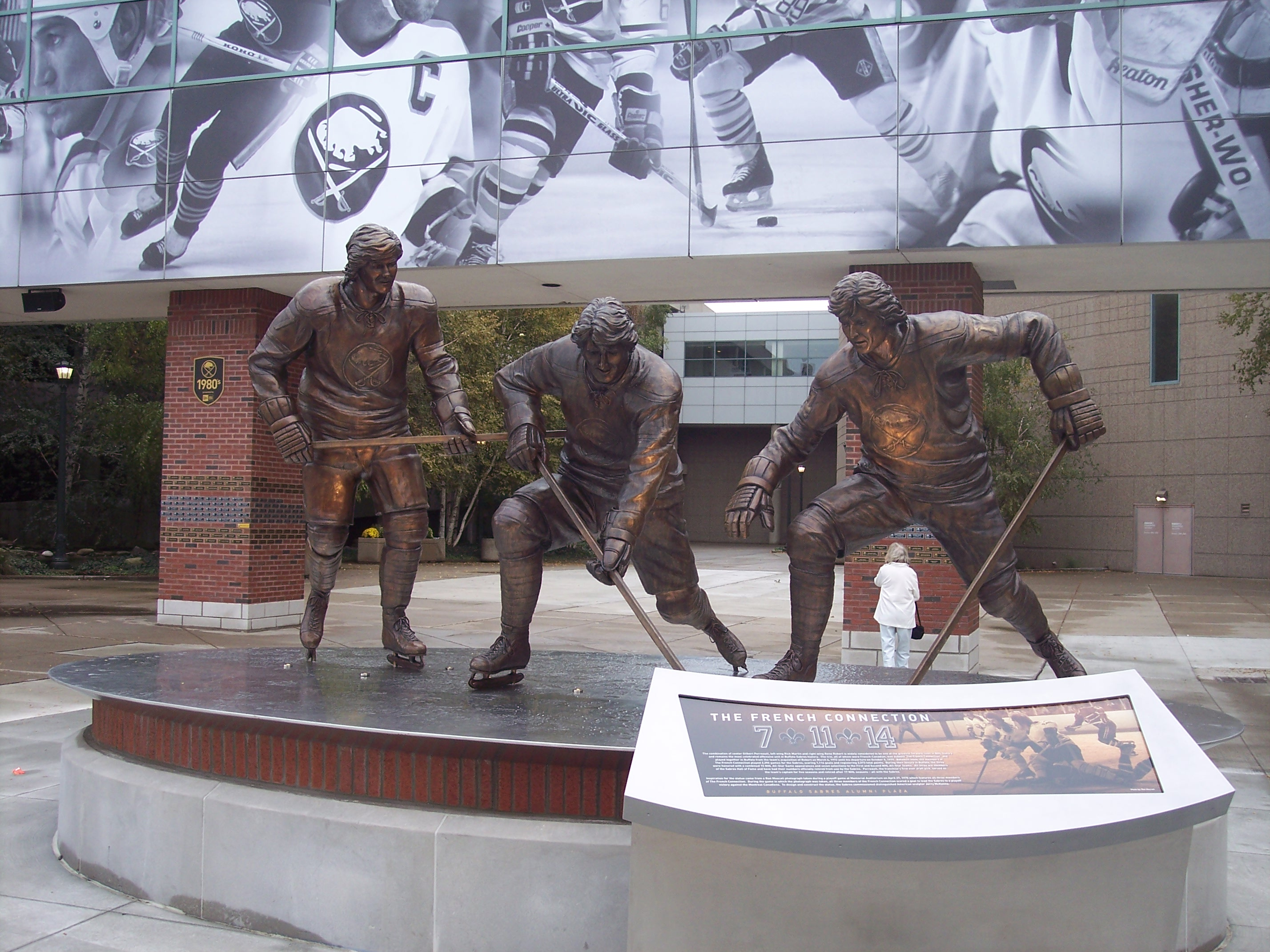
The French Connection statue in Alumni Plaza, October 2012

The fifth update features the creation of the Tops Markets Alumni Plaza. In July 2012, the space located between the arena's entrance pavilion and the parking ramp saw the concrete bridge columns covered with brick. All of the team members that the Buffalo Sabres have had throughout existence are now featured on plaques that are mounted to the bricks. In addition, fans of the Sabres are able to purchase custom plaques that will be featured alongside the team members. Alumni Plaza's centerpiece is a 10' high bronze statue of The French Connection. These renovations were completed in October 2012.

The sixth update included multiple changes, including modifying the entrance pavilion due to the LECOM Harborcenter construction. That building is attached to the arena by an elevated walkway. LECOM Harborcenter is a mid-rise building with 2 hockey rinks, a Marriott hotel, retail space, IMPACT Training facility, restaurants including 716 Food and Sport and flagship Tim Hortons and a parking garage. Construction began in early 2013, while the restaurants and rinks opened in late October 2014. The elevated walkway connecting the KeyBank Center and LECOM Harborcenter buildings was completed and opened in early 2015, while the Marriott hotel opened in the summer of 2015. Also, after the 2011-12 Buffalo Sabres season, the Sabres added 380 seats, mainly as an additional row in the 200 level, to raise the arena's capacity to 19,070. This number is symbolic of the team's founding in 1970. In 2013, the Buffalo Sabres announced that all 80 luxury suites would be renovated over a 3-year period. All suites will now feature the Sabres Blue and Gold color scheme, 50" TVs, new carpeting, new furniture and gathering islands. Construction began on this project in July 2013.

The seventh update took place during the summer of 2016 on the exterior due to the renaming from First Niagara Center to KeyBank Center. The entrance canopies that featured hockey images were replaced. New exterior signage was installed during the week of August 11, 2016 and KeyBank debuted the rebranded arena on September 19, 2016. Also, a new LED lighting system was installed by Ephesus. This allows the arena to provide better lighting while significantly reducing the number of light fixtures needed and reducing energy consumption.

The arena's main scoreboard and roof were replaced in the spring/summer of 2024. The new 27 ft. x 43 ft. scoreboard, manufactured by Mitsubishi, became the largest center-hung video board in an indoor sports arena in New York State upon its installation.

=== Naming rights and ownership ===
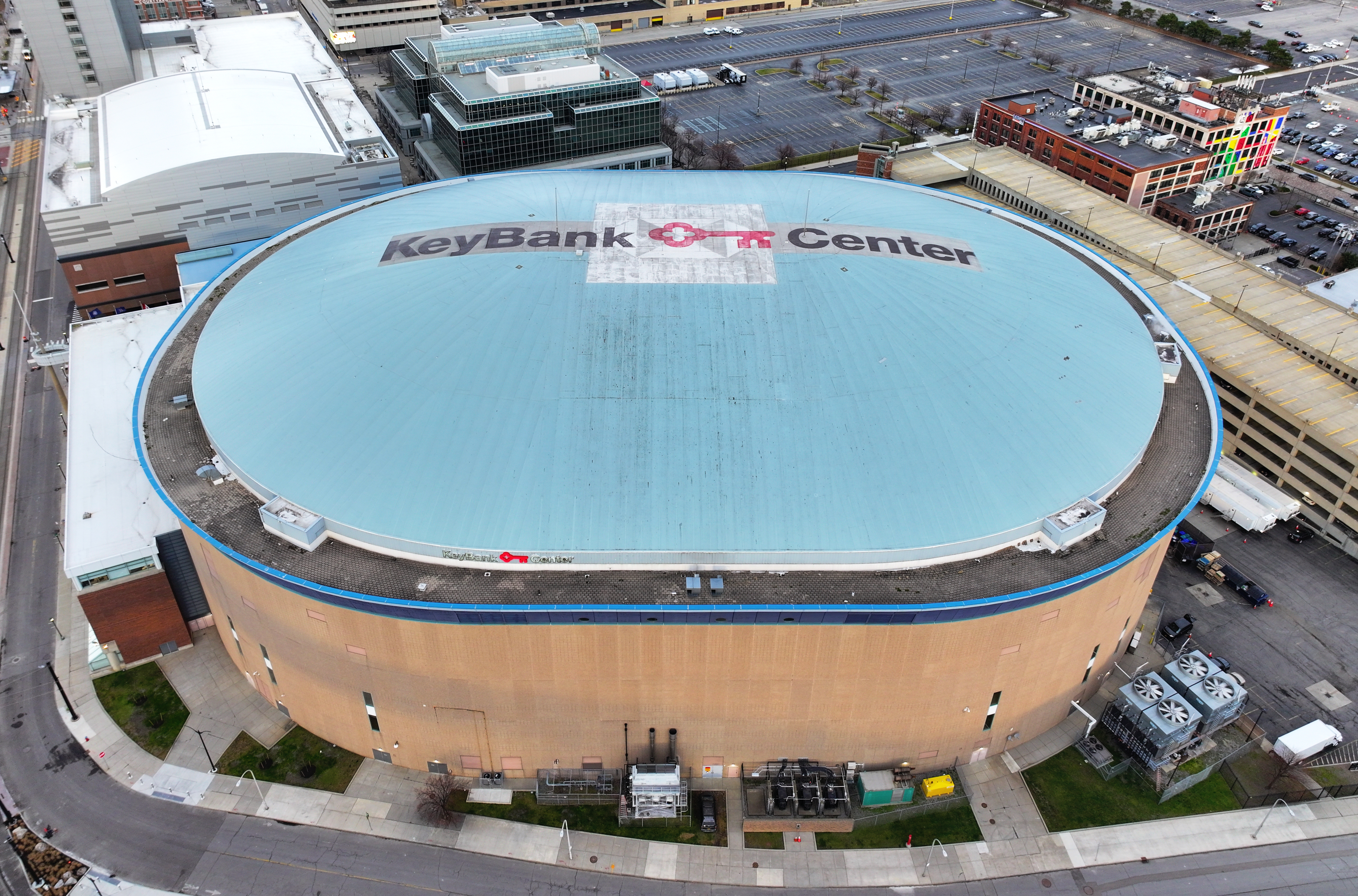
Exterior of the arena in 2023

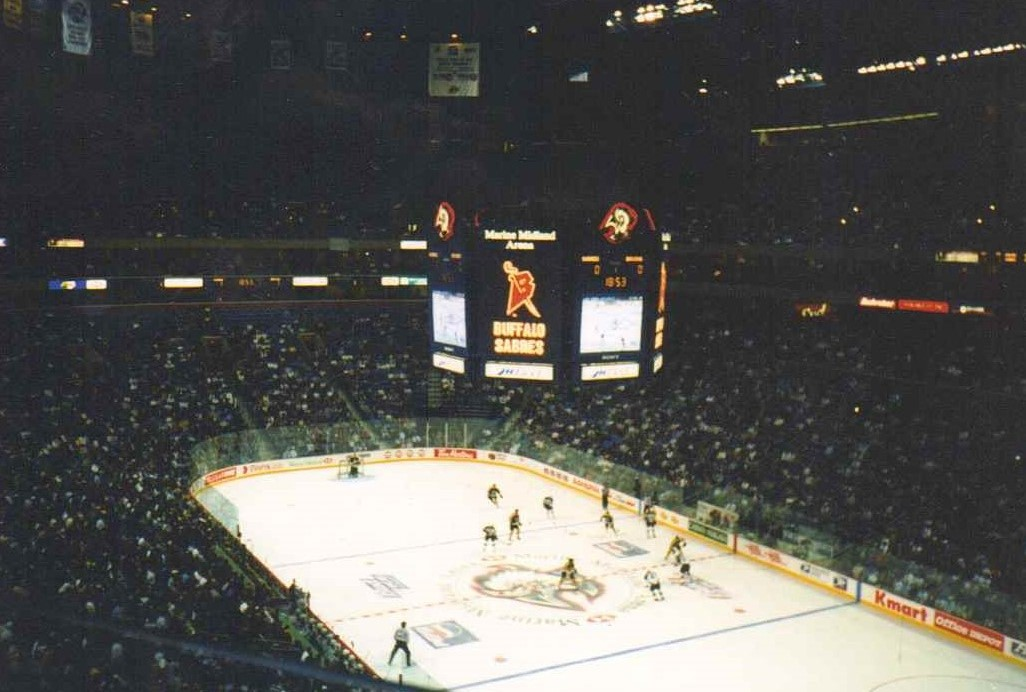
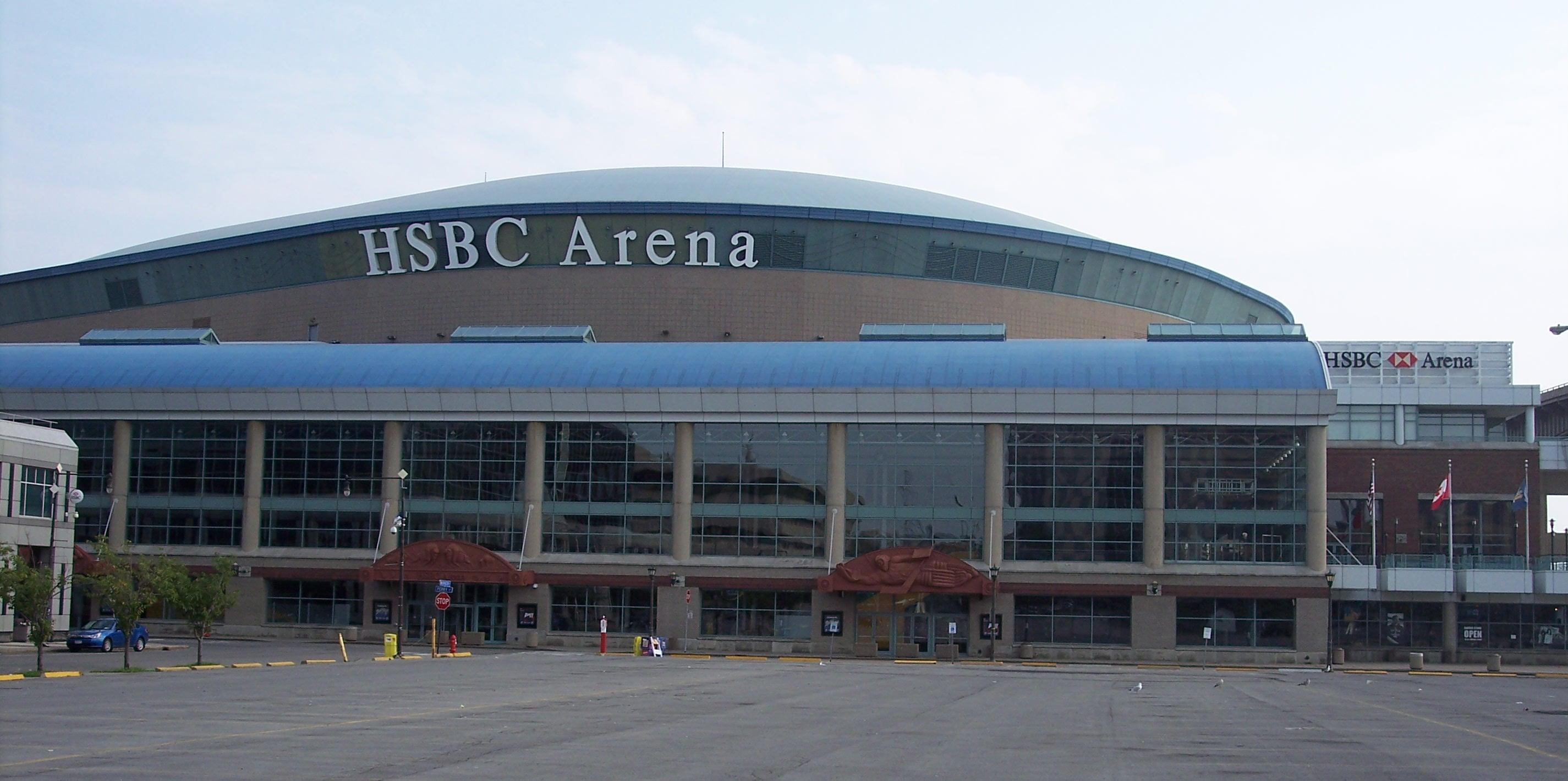
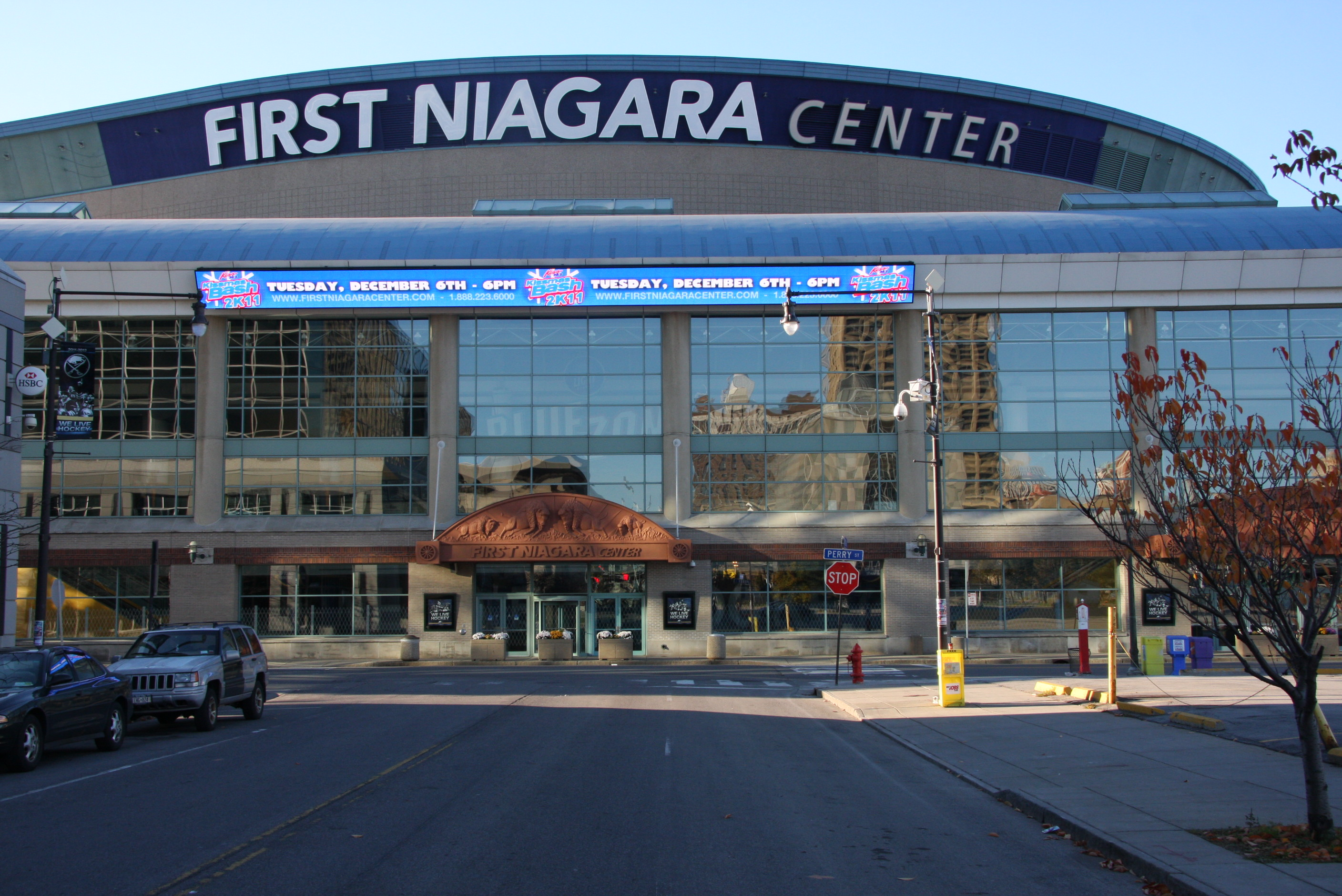
Clockwise from upper left: Marine Midland Arena, HSBC Arena, First Niagara Center

Naming rights were sold to Buffalo-based Marine Midland Bank, part of the HSBC banking group in 1996, and the building was renamed Marine Midland Arena before the first game had been played. The bank bought the naming rights for 30 years then to expire in 2026. At the same time, the City of Buffalo also signed a 30 year lease agreement with the Erie County government as the city maintains the ownership of the arena lands while the county leases the building from the city.

In 1999, as part of HSBC's worldwide corporate rebranding, the arena's name was changed to HSBC Arena, with the official renaming taking place on March 17, 2000. This name change coincided with the playing of the first college basketball tournament game in the arena's history.

In 2011, Buffalo-based First Niagara Financial Group reached an agreement to purchase HSBC Bank's upstate New York and Connecticut branch network, including much of the core of the old Marine Midland. While naming rights to HSBC Arena were not included in the sale, First Niagara, HSBC, the Buffalo Sabres and other parties reached an agreement to establish a new naming rights deal with First Niagara. The name of the arena became First Niagara Center that summer, with the official renaming taking place that fall. First Niagara bought the naming rights for 15 years, approximately the remainder of the time that was left on HSBC's naming rights deal with the arena.

KeyBank announced its plans to purchase First Niagara—and thus also the naming rights to the arena—on October 30, 2015. Although exterior signage was installed during the week of August 11, 2016, the renamed KeyBank Center became official on September 19, 2016.

In April 2025, Erie County announced its intention to withdraw from the lease agreement when it expired in 2026, although it was initially unclear if the building would revert to city ownership. On September 27, 2025, the Sabres announced a 5-year extension of the current lease agreement, which was extended through September 2031. The team also announced that it was in "the early stages" of developing a long-term plan for the arena, including plans for additional renovations. The team also stated that it would continue to negotiate with Erie County on the next phase of a future lease agreement.

On July 30, 2025, it was announced by the Buffalo Sabres and KeyBank that the naming rights to KeyBank Center were extended through the 2035–36 season.

== Notable events ==
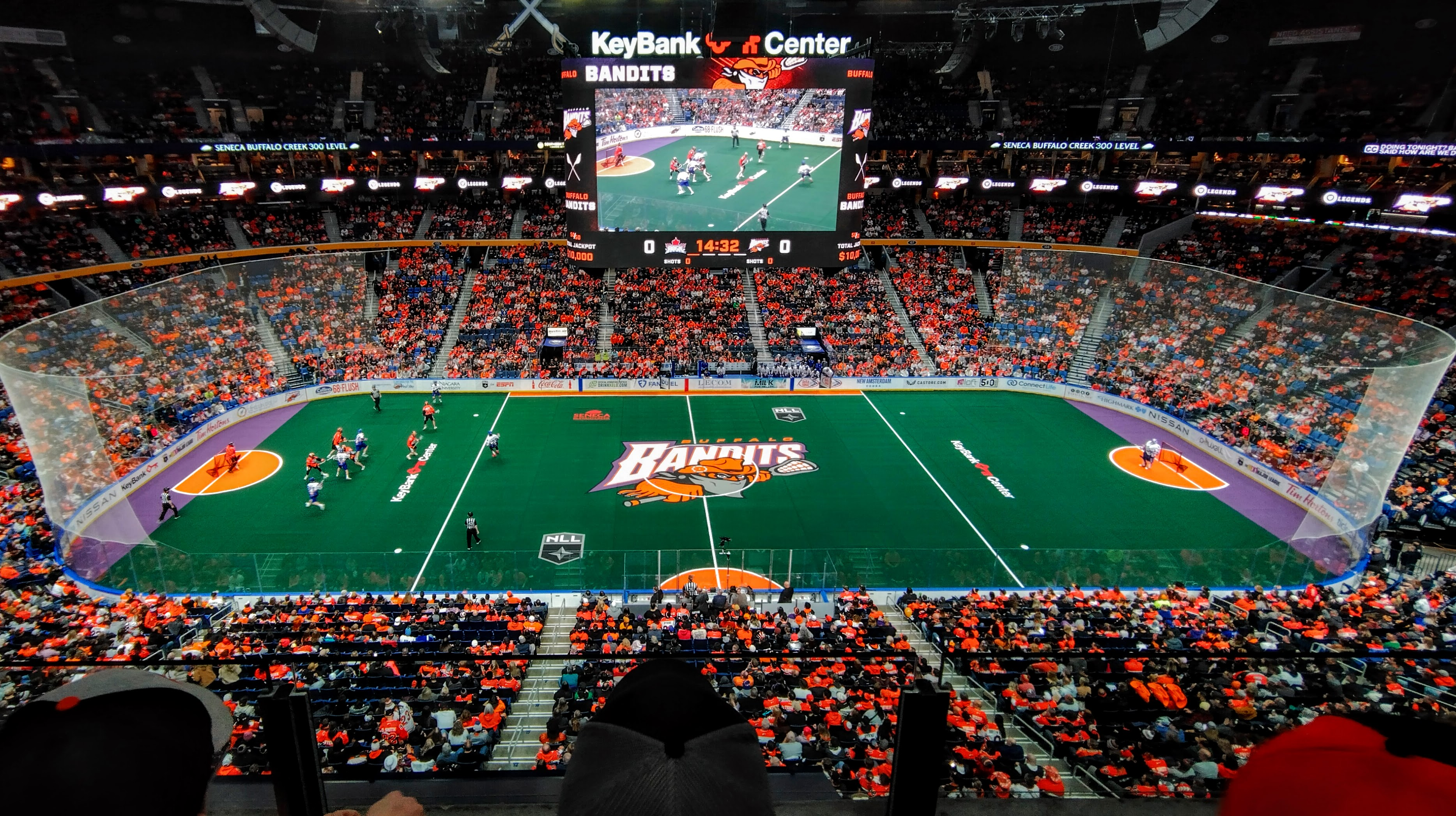
The venue's interior during a Buffalo Bandits game, January 2025

=== Hockey ===
==== NHL ====
The venue hosted its first Buffalo Sabres regular season home game on October 12th, 1996. The arena hosted games three, four, and six of the 1999 Stanley Cup Finals.

Since 2015, the KeyBank Center and the Harborcenter have hosted the annual NHL draft combine. The arena hosted the 1998 NHL entry draft, 2016 NHL entry draft and the 2026 NHL entry draft.

==== Other events ====
- In 2003, the arena hosted the Frozen Four NCAA Ice Hockey tournament.
- From December 2010 to January 2011, the arena hosted the IIHF World Junior Championship tournament.
- During the 2012 NHL lockout, the arena hosted several Rochester Americans games and continues to host occasional Americans games at the arena.
- In October 2014, the arena hosted its first Ontario Hockey League contest, a neutral-site game between the Erie Otters and the Niagara IceDogs.
- On December 29, 2018, the Buffalo Beauts hosted the Minnesota Whitecaps for the first National Women's Hockey League (NWHL) game played at the arena.
- In 2019, the arena hosted the Frozen Four NCAA Ice Hockey tournament again for the first time in 16 years.
- On February 23, 2025, the first Professional Women's Hockey League (PWHL) game in Buffalo was played, with the arena as a neutral-site venue, between the Boston Fleet and the New York Sirens. The Fleet won 3–2 in front of 8,512 fans. The PWHL returned on March 14, 2027 for a game between the Hamilton Havoc and New York Sirens.

=== Basketball ===
The NBA carried over their annual preseason contest from Buffalo Memorial Auditorium with annual Toronto Raptors preseason games at the new venue.

Canisius College played select home games at the arena from 1996 to 1998, moving there after decades at the Aud. However, they moved all games on campus to the Koessler Center after the 1997–98 season.

The arena has been home to the NCAA (2000, 2004, 2007, 2010, 2014, 2017, 2022, 2026) and MAAC (1997, 1999, 2001, 2005) men's basketball tournaments.

The arena was the centerpiece of a longshot bid to bring the National Basketball Association back to Buffalo since the Buffalo Braves left in 1978 by luring the Vancouver Grizzlies; the Grizzlies instead relocated to Memphis, Tennessee in 2001.

=== Professional wrestling ===
KeyBank Center has hosted professional wrestling events from WCW, WWE, and AEW. This included TV tapings of Monday Nitro, Raw is War, SmackDown, ECW, Superstars, Main Event, NXT, Dynamite, and Rampage. WCW produced the annual Ilio DiPaolo Memorial Show at the venue between 1997 and 1999.

In addition, the venue hosted several pay-per-view events including Fully Loaded (1999), Fall Brawl (2000), The Great American Bash (2005), Armageddon (2008), Night of Champions (2011) and Battleground (2013).

=== Other sports ===
On April 8, 2017, KeyBank Center hosted UFC 210: Cormier vs. Johnson 2, which was the first UFC event held in Buffalo for over 20 years.

=== Concerts ===
Performances from Barenaked Ladies' October 9, 1998 concert at the venue are featured in their 1999 documentary Barenaked in America.

Avril Lavigne's May 18, 2003 concert at the venue was released as Avril Lavigne: My World.

On July 7, 2014 Lady Gaga performed at the KeyBank Center as part of her artRAVE: The ARTPOP Ball Tour.

A live recording of Bruce Springsteen and the E Street Band's performance at the arena in 2009 titled HSBC Arena, Buffalo, NY, 11/22/09 was released on December 24, 2016.

Other notable artists who have performed at the arena include Kanye West, Justin Bieber, Paul McCartney, Bruno Mars, and The Goo Goo Dolls. It is a regular stop on Trans-Siberian Orchestra's annual tours.

== Special features ==
=== Tributes ===
The press box in the arena is named after former Sabres broadcaster and Hockey Hall of Fame member Ted Darling.

The intersection of Perry and Illinois streets outside of the arena have been dedicated as "Rick Jeanneret (RJ) Way" in memory of Hockey Hall of Famer, and the former play-by-play broadcaster of 51 years.

Events and tenants
Preceded by Buffalo Memorial Auditorium	Home of the Buffalo Sabres; 1996 – present	Succeeded by Present
Preceded by Buffalo Memorial Auditorium	Home of the Buffalo Bandits; 1996 – present	Succeeded by Present
Preceded by Buffalo Memorial Auditorium	Home of the Canisius Golden Griffins; 1996 – 1998	Succeeded by Koessler Athletic Center
Preceded by Xcel Energy Center	Host of the Frozen Four; 2003	Succeeded by FleetCenter
Preceded by Credit Union Centre and Brandt Centre	Host of the IIHF World Junior Championship; 2011	Succeeded by Scotiabank Saddledome and Rexall Place
Preceded by Turning Stone Resort Casino	Host of the NLL All-Star Game; 2012	Succeeded by Final event
Preceded by BB&T Center	Host of the NHL entry draft 2016	Succeeded by United Center
Preceded by Bell Centre and Air Canada Centre	Host of the IIHF World Junior Championship; 2018	Succeeded by Rogers Arena and Save-On-Foods Memorial Centre
Preceded by Xcel Energy Center	Host of the Frozen Four; 2019	Succeeded by PPG Paints Arena
