= Tali =

Tali may refer to:

== Places ==
- Alternate spelling of Dali, city in China
- Tali, Estonia, village in Saarde Parish, Pärnu County, Estonia
- Tali, Helsinki, Finland
- Tali, township, part of Kozhikode, Kerala, India
- Tali, Arunachal Pradesh, place in Arunachal Pradesh State of India
- Tali, Mazandaran or Taleh, village in Mazandaran Province, Iran
- Tali, West Azerbaijan or Tuli, village in West Azerbaijan Province, Iran
- Tali, Finnish name for Paltsevo, Leningrad Oblast, Russia. Location of Battle of Tali-Ihantala
- Taleex, also known as Tali or Taleh, small town in northeast Somalia
- Tali County, area of Terekeka State, South Sudan
- Tali, town in South Sudan

== Other uses ==
- Another name for the Dalbergia sissoo rosewood tree
- A normal beat indicating the beginning of a subdivision in the taal rhythmic cycle
- MC Tali, a drum and bass artist
- Knucklebones used for dice in Ancient Rome
- Plural of talus, a bone of the foot that articulates with the tibia and fibula
- Another name for mangala sutra, a necklace put onto the bride by the groom in a Hindu wedding

== People with the surname ==
- Anu Tali (born 1972), Estonian conductor, twin sister of Kadri
- Jason Tali (born 1987), Papua New Guinean rugby league player
- Kadri Tali (born 1972), Estonian conductor, twin sister of Anu
- Kadri Tali (botanist) (born 1966), Estonian botanist to whom the standard botanical abbreviation Tali refers
- Peeter Tali (born 1964), Estonian military person and journalist
- T. Tali (c. 1943 – 2020), Indian politician from Nagaland
- Urmas Tali (born 1970), Estonian volleyball player and coach

== People with the given name ==
Tali is a feminine name derived from the Hebrew for "my lamb" (טלה) or "dew" (טל). People called Tali include:

- Tali Darsigny (born 1998), Canadian weightlifter
- Tali Shalom Ezer (born 1978), Israeli filmmaker, writer, and director
- Tali Fahima (born 1976), Israeli pro-Palestinian activist
- Tali Farhadian (born 1975 or 1976), Iranian-born American former federal prosecutor
- Tali Golergant (born 2000), Luxembourgish singer-songwriter
- Tali Goya (born 1990), Dominican rapper
- Tali Lennox (born 1993), British model, artist and actress
- Tali Mendelberg (born 1964), American political scientist
- Tali Moreno (born 1981), Israeli news presenter and reporter
- Tali Tali Pompey (1940s – 2011), Australian Aboriginal artist
- Tali Sharot, cognitive neuroscientist
- Tali'Zorah, a character in the Mass Effect series

== See also ==
- Taali (disambiguation)
- Thali (disambiguation)
