= Tahli =

Tahli may refer to:

- Tahli, Dasuya, village in Hoshiarpur, Punjab, India
- Tahli, Nakodar, village in Jalandhar, Punjab, India

== See also ==
- Thali (disambiguation)
