= Thaali (disambiguation) =

In Tamil and Malayalam languages, Thaali is the name for a mangala sutra, a necklace that a groom ties around the bride's neck in a ceremony called Mangalya Dharanam.

Thaali may also refer to:

- Thaali (1993 film), Malayalam film directed by Sajan
- Thaali (1997 film), Telugu film directed by E. V. V. Satyanarayana

== See also ==
- Thali (disambiguation)
- Taali (disambiguation)
