= Taali =

Taali (ताली) means clap in Hindi. It may also refer to:

- Taali (village), in Estonia
- Taali (musician) (born 1988), American singer and songwriter
- De Taali, 2008 Hindi comedy film
- Taali (TV series), 2023 Hindi drama TV series, based on Shreegauri Sawant

== See also ==
- Tali (disambiguation)
- Thaali (disambiguation)
