= Turi =

Turi or TURI may refer to:

== Places ==
Ecuador

- Turi, Ecuador, a town and parish

Estonia

- Türi, a town
- Türi Parish, a rural municipality in Järva County

Indonesia

- Turi, Lamongan, a district in Lamongan Regency, East Java
- Turi, Magetan, a village in Panekan, Magetan Regency, East Java
- Turi, Yogyakarta, a district in Sleman Regency, Yogyakarta

Italy

- Turi, Apulia, a comune in the province of Bari

Kenya

- Turi, Kenya, a settlement west of Nakuru

== Persons with the name ==
"Turi" is also nickname for the given name Salvatore

- Turi (Māori ancestor), an historical Maori leader
- Indrek Turi (born 1981), Estonian decathlete
- Johan Turi (1854–1936), Norwegian-Sami wolf-hunter and writer
- Pasquale Turi (born 1993), Italian footballer
- Géza Turi (born 1974), Hungarian footballer

== Other uses ==
- Turi (Caste), a social group of East India
- Turi (Pashtun tribe), a Pashtun tribe in Pakistan and Afghanistan
- Aheria, an ethnic group of India also known as Turi
- Turi language, a Munda language of India
- Turi (Māori ancestor), an historical Maori leader
- Turi, one of Queen Victoria's pets
- Massachusetts Toxics Use Reduction Institute (TURI)

== See also ==
- Thuri (disambiguation)
