= Steve Broderick =

American vocalist

- Born: January 1, 1981 (age 45)
- Occupation: Singer

Steve Broderick (born January 1, 1981) is an American vocalist who was a member of the Trans-Siberian Orchestra from 2000 to 2009.

Broderick was a backup singer in the band's 2009 album, Night Castle, and the band's 2015 album, Letters from the Labyrinth.
