= Night Castle =

2009 studio album by Trans-Siberian Orchestra

Studio album by Trans-Siberian Orchestra
- Released: October 28, 2009
- Genre: Symphonic metal; progressive metal; neoclassical metal
- Length: 2:01:30
- Label: Lava
- Producer: Paul O'Neill; Robert Kinkel

Trans-Siberian Orchestra chronology
The Lost Christmas Eve (2004)	Night Castle (2009)	Dreams of Fireflies (On a Christmas Night) (2012)

Singles from Night Castle
- 1. "Nut Rocker" Released: December 2009

Professional ratings
Review scores
Source	Rating
AllMusic -	2.5/5 stars

Night Castle is the fifth studio album by the Trans-Siberian Orchestra. It was released on October 28, 2009, as a double CD with a 60-page booklet illustrated by Greg Hildebrandt, and debuted at No. 5 on the Billboard charts and No. 1 on the rock music charts. It was certified gold in eight weeks and is currently a platinum album.

== Overview ==
The story revolves around a young child on a beach late at night, where she encounters a mysterious but non-threatening stranger. While they build a sandcastle together by the light of a bonfire, he tells her a tale that takes her all around the world and throughout history. The characters of this story include an American Vietnam War soldier named William Cozier, the Renaissance era philosopher Erasmus who is the keeper of the eponymous castle of lost knowledge, and a Communist general based on the dissident Tran Do.

In 2011, Atlantic released the album on vinyl in an eight side (four disc) set in a special slip box designed to avoid the cracked corners that plague many vinyl box sets. The album includes a version of Kim Fowley's Nut Rocker as a tribute to Emerson, Lake & Palmer, who in turn had performed the song as a tribute to Tchaikovsky. Greg Lake from Emerson, Lake & Palmer honored the band by playing bass on the album.

Bonus tracks include the songs "Child of the Night" and "Believe" which, according to the band, are a glimpse into future projects. An additional bonus track, "The Flight of Cassandra", was available exclusively online on Amazon.com, the first time that TSO had done something like this.

== Savatage connections ==
Some of the songs on Night Castle trace their origins to music written by Savatage, the heavy metal band from which the Trans-Siberian Orchestra evolved.

- "The Mountain" was originally recorded as "Prelude to Madness" on Savatage's Hall of the Mountain King album. The song itself is based on Edvard Grieg's In the Hall of the Mountain King with new music added in the style of Holst.
- Parts of the song "The Lion's Roar" are taken from the song "Temptation Revelation" off of the Gutter Ballet album. Parts are also from the traditional Irish song "The Minstrel Boy".
- "Mozart and Memories", a reworking of Mozart's Symphony No. 25, was originally recorded as "Mozart and Madness" on Dead Winter Dead.
- "Believe" was originally featured on Streets: A Rock Opera; portions of it also appear in "Alone You Breathe" on Handful of Rain and "When The Crowds Are Gone" on Gutter Ballet. The version on Nightcastle includes a mix of vocalist Tim Hockenberry's vocals that were recorded in his garage and later in the studio and the only extended guitar studio contribution to TSO by Alex Skolnick.

== Reception ==
The album was rated 2.5 stars out of 5 by Allmusic, while the site's users gave it an average rating of 3.5 stars, based on 38 reviews.

As of April 2013, iTunes customers rated it an average of 4.5 on a scale of 1 to 5.

== Track listing ==
=== Disc one ===
No.	Title	Writer(s)	Vocals	Length
1.	"Night Enchanted"	Giuseppe Verdi, Léo Delibes, Paul O'Neill		5:46
2.	"Childhood Dreams"	O'Neill, Jon Oliva	Jay Pierce	4:25
3.	"Sparks"	O'Neill	Tim Hockenberry	6:01
4.	"The Mountain" (Instrumental - originally performed by Savatage as "Prelude To Madness")	Edvard Grieg, O'Neill, Oliva		4:54
5.	"Night Castle"	O'Neill, Oliva	Jeff Scott Soto	3:57
6.	"The Safest Way into Tomorrow"	O'Neill, Oliva	Pierce	4:57
7.	"Mozart and Memories" (Instrumental - originally performed by Savatage as "Mozart and Madness")	Wolfgang Amadeus Mozart, O'Neill, Oliva		5:16
8.	"Another Way You Can Die"	O'Neill, Oliva	Soto	3:54
9.	"Toccata – Carpimus Noctem" (Instrumental)	Johann Sebastian Bach, O'Neill		4:02
10.	"The Lion's Roar" (Instrumental)	O'Neill, Al Pitrelli		4:36
11.	"Dreams We Conceive"	O'Neill, Oliva	Soto	5:13
12.	"Mother and Son"	O'Neill		0:41
13.	"There Was a Life"	O'Neill, Oliva	Rob Evan	9:35
Total length:				63:10

=== Disc two ===
No.	Title	Writer(s)	Vocals	Length
1.	"Moonlight and Madness" (Instrumental)	Ludwig van Beethoven, Frédéric Chopin, O'Neill, Paul Silverstein		5:04
2.	"Time Floats On"	O'Neill, Oliva	Soto	3:33
3.	"Epiphany"	O'Neill, Oliva	Evan	11:00
4.	"Bach Lullaby" (Instrumental)	Bach		0:50
5.	"Father, Son & Holy Ghost"	O'Neill, Chris Caffery	Jennifer Cella	6:48
6.	"Remnants of a Lullaby"	O'Neill, Oliva	Cella	3:10
7.	"The Safest Way into Tomorrow (Reprise)"	O'Neill, Oliva	Soto	1:43
8.	"Embers" (Instrumental)	O'Neill, Ireland Wilde O'Neill		3:53

Bonus tracks
No.	Title	Writer(s)	Vocals	Length
9.	"Child of the Night" (The Flower Duet)	Delibes, O'Neill	Alexa Goddard, Valentina Porter	3:29
10.	"Believe" (Savatage cover)	O'Neill	Hockenberry	6:12
11.	"Nutrocker" (Instrumental)	Pyotr Ilyich Tchaikovsky, Kim Fowley		4:07
12.	"Carmina Burana"	Carl Orff		2:44
13.	"Tracers" (Instrumental)	O'Neill, Pitrelli, Jane Mangini		5:47
Total length:				58:20

Amazon Bonus Track
No.	Title	Length
14.	"The Flight of Cassandra" (Instrumental)	6:48
Total length:		69:58

European release exclusive live tracks
No.	Title	Length
14.	"Requiem" (Live 2010)	3:56
15.	"Toccata – Carpimus Noctem" (Live 2010)	4:27
Total length:		66:39

== Personnel ==
- Paul O'Neill – producer
- Robert Kinkel – producer
- Dave Wittman – recording and mixing engineer

=== Performers ===
==== Vocals ====
Solo:

- Jay Pierce – "Childhood Dreams", "The Safest Way into Tomorrow"
- Tim Hockenberry – "Sparks", "Believe"
- Jeff Scott Soto – "Night Castle", "Another Way You Can Die", "Dreams We Conceive", "Time Floats On", "The Safest Way into Tomorrow (Reprise)"
- Rob Evan – "There Was a Life", "Epiphany"
- Jennifer Cella – "Father, Son, and Holy Ghost", "Remnants of a Lullaby"
- Alexa Goddard – "Child of the Night"
- Valentina Porter – "Child of the Night"

Backup:

- Steve Broderick
- Luci Butler
- Jennifer Cella
- Britney Christian
- Rob Evan
- Dina Fanai
- Tommy Farese
- Allison Flom
- Tony Gaynor
- Christie George
- Alexa Goddard
- Kristin Lewis Gorman
- Erin Henry
- Steena Hernandez
- Kelly Keeling
- Robert Kinkel
- Danielle Landherr
- James Lewis
- Tany Ling
- Sanya Mateyas
- Ireland Wilde O'Neill
- Valentina Porter
- Andrew Ross
- Bart Shatto
- Evan Shyer
- Abby Skoff
- Zachary Stevens
- Adrienne Warren
- Scout Xavier

Guide:

- Bryan Hicks – "Epiphany"
- Dina Fanai – "Night Enchanted"
- Robert Kinkel – "Night Enchanted"

Gospel Choir:

- Keith Jacobs
- Lucille Jacobs
- Nathaniel Jacobs
- Shelia Upshaw

Child Choir:

- The American Boychoir, directed by Fernando Malvar-Ruiz

Vietnamese Dialogue:

- Truc Xuan Le
- Khanh Ong
- Nhattien Nguyen
- Nga Nguyen

==== Instruments ====
Band:

- Paul O'Neill – Guitars
- Robert Kinkel – Keyboards
- Jon Oliva – Keyboards
- Al Pitrelli – Lead & Rhythm Guitars
- Chris Altenhoff – Bass
- Luci Butler – Keyboards
- Chris Caffery – Guitars
- Shih-Yi Chiang – Keyboards
- Roddy Chong – Violin
- Angus Clark – Guitars
- Jane Mangini – Keyboards
- Johnny Lee Middleton – Bass
- John O. Reilly – Drums
- Anna Phoebe – Strings
- Jeff Plate – Drums
- Alex Skolnick – Guitars
- Derek Wieland – Keyboards
- Dave Wittman – Drum, Guitar, & Bass Inserts

Strings:

- Roddy Chong
- Caitlin Moe
- Anna Phoebe
- Allison Zlotow
- Lowell Adams
- Karen Dumke
- Lei Liu
- Chizuko Matsusaka
- Sarah Shellman

Additional Instruments:

- Jeff Allegue – Bass
- Jay Coble – Trumpet
- Alicia Crawford – Bass
- Jason Gianni – Drums
- Peter Evans – Trumpet
- Max Johnson – Bass
- Greg Lake – Bass on "Nutrocker"
- Trey Tosh – Guitars
- Criss Oliva – Guitars on the original version of "The Mountain".

== Charts ==
=== Weekly charts ===
Chart (2009)	Peak position
Canadian Albums (Billboard)	24
US Billboard 200	5
US Top Hard Rock Albums (Billboard)	1
US Top Rock Albums (Billboard)	2

=== Year-end charts ===
Chart (2010)	Position
US Billboard 200	134
US Top Rock Albums (Billboard)	35
