= Thuri =

Thuri may refer to:

- Thuri people, of South Sudan
- Thuri language, of South Sudan
- Thuri, a surname; notable people include:
  - František Xaver Thuri (1939–2019), Czech composer, oboist, organist and musicologist
  - Jan Thuri (born 1975), Czech oboist

== See also ==
- Thari (disambiguation)
- Turi (disambiguation)
