= Tari (name) =

Tari may refer to the following people:

== Given name ==
- Tari Eason (born 2001), American basketball player
- Tari Khan (born 1953), Pakistani tabla player and vocalist
- Tari Phillips (born 1969), American basketball player
- Tari Signor (born 1967), American actress
- Tari, the protagonist of the animated web series Meta Runner

== Surname ==
- Aryan Tari (born 1999), Norwegian chess player
- Ben Tari (born 1972), Australian actor
- Cut Tari (born 1977), Indonesian soap opera actress and model
- El Tari (1926–1978), Indonesian Governor
- Kenny Tari (born 1990), Vanuatuan cricketer
- Le Tari (1946–1987), American actor
- Moulana Abdullah Tari (1939–2026), Indian Islamic scholar and political activist
- Ronald Tari (born 1994), Vanuatuan cricketer
- Steven Tari (1971–2013), Papua New Guinean religious figure
- Tan Tarı (born 1935), Turkish wrestler
- Zainab Tari, 11th century Queen of Sindh (modern-day Pakistan)
