= Thari =

Thari may refer to:

- something of, from, or related to Tharparkar, a region of Sindh, Pakistan
  - Thari people or the Dhatki, an ethnic group in Pakistan
  - Thari language or Dhatki, spoken in Sindh, Pakistan
- Tharri, a town in Larkana District, Sindh, Pakistan
- Thari Mirwah, or Thari, a town in Khairpur District, Sindh, Pakistan
- Thari (TV series), a 2019 Indian Tamil-language TV series

== See also ==
- Thar (disambiguation)
- Thali (disambiguation)
- Tari (disambiguation)
- Thuri (disambiguation)
