= Tari (Kashmiri tribe) =

Tari (Hindi: तरी, Urdu: تاری) is a Kashmiri tribe and family name in the Kashmir region of India and Pakistan.
