= Tary, Volgograd Oblast =

Tary Тары
- Khutor
- Location within Volgograd Oblast Location within Russia
- Coordinates: 49°21′N 43°59′E
- Country: Russia
- Region: Volgograd Oblast
- District: Ilovlinsky District
- Time zone: UTC+4:00

Tary (Russian: Тары) is a rural locality (a khutor) in Avilovskoye Rural Settlement, Ilovlinsky District, Volgograd Oblast, Russia. The population was 301 as of 2010. There are 10 streets.

== Geography ==
Tary is located in steppe, on the right bank of the Ilovlya River, 9 km north of Ilovlya (the district's administrative centre) by road. Avilov is the nearest rural locality.
