= Alexa Goddard =

English pop and R&B singer

- Born: 21 December 1990 (age 35)
- Origin: Yateley, Hampshire, England
- Genres: Pop; R&B
- Occupations: Singer; YouTuber
- Instrument: Vocals
- Years active: 2003–present
- Label: Roc Nation

YouTube information
- Channel: Alexa Goddard
- Years active: 2010–present
- Genre: Music
- Subscribers: 364 thousand
- Views: 57.1 million
- Last updated: 26 March 2025

Alexa Goddard (born 21 December 1990) is an English pop and R&B singer from Blackwater, Hampshire previously signed to Roc Nation. Born in Camberley, Surrey, Goddard was spotted singing at a talent contest at the age of 14. From 2007, she featured on three consecutive winter tours of the United States and Canada with the American band Trans-Siberian Orchestra and performed a duet of "Child of the Night", a track from the band's 2009 album Night Castle.

In March 2010, Goddard created a YouTube channel with the username "AlexaMusicTV". She uploaded to this channel various videos of her own covers of R&B hits. She released four cover versions as singles, using social media, such as Twitter (later changed to X), to promote them. The biggest-selling of these was her version of "Turn My Swag On," which charted at Number 20 on the UK Singles Chart and Number One on the UK Indie Chart.

== Life and music career ==
Goddard was born and raised in Blackwater, Hampshire. She attended Yateley School from the age of 11 and was spotted singing at a talent contest when she was 14. As a result of her performance at this talent show, she began singing professionally and made regular recording sessions at a Sony subsidiary in Berlin.

"Speechless"
Goddard's version of "Speechless" uses the sound of snapping fingers to provide a percussive beat.

In 2008, at the age of 19, Goddard was invited to join the American progressive rock band Trans-Siberian Orchestra on their winter tour of the United States and Canada. On 29 June 2008, she featured as one of approximately 400 performers at the UEFA Euro 2008 Final, where she sang "Off the Rails" and her first single, a cover of "Speechless" by The Veronicas. "Speechless" was released through the iTunes Store on 8 August, and was used to soundtrack a German advert for Ferrero Raffaello. Goddard was again invited back to perform on Trans-Siberian Orchestra's 2008 and 2009 winter tours, and featured on their 2009 multi-platinum selling album Night Castle, where she had a solo on "Child of the Night" as well as providing backing vocals for other tracks.

On 13 March 2010, Goddard registered a YouTube channel under the username "AlexaMusicTV" with her manager and producer Stewart "Stew Mac" McLean. She uploaded to this channel videos of her own versions of well-known R&B songs—her first uploads included her version of "Speechless", as well as covers of "Make You Feel My Love" by Bob Dylan, "Cry Me a River" by Justin Timberlake and "Sweet Dreams" by Beyoncé. Within a month, Goddard's videos had received over 1.5 million views and "AlexaMusicTV" had garnered over 7,000 subscribers.

Goddard's second single was a cover of "Dynamite" by Taio Cruz, which was released through the iTunes Store by McLean's label IdleIDOL Records on 18 October 2010—this was then followed on 12 November by a release of her cover of "Whip My Hair" by Willow Smith. Just over two weeks later, on 29 November, Goddard released her fourth single through iTunes, a cover of Keri Hilson's remix of "Turn My Swag On" by Soulja Boy. The track was mainly promoted through word of mouth and use of social media, such as Twitter and Facebook. After being downloaded nearly 14,000 times in the UK, Goddard's single charted at Number 26 on the UK Singles Chart. The following week, the single climbed to Number 20 on the UK Singles Chart, and topped the UK Indie Chart. In December 2010, Goddard provided the female vocals on Brett Domino's cover of "Fairytale of New York" by The Pogues. The single peaked at Number 32 on the UK Indie Chart.

In March 2011, British rapper Wiley's single "Seduction", which features Goddard, premiered on radio; a video was shot two weeks later. The single was released on 2 May 2011. On 22 April 2014, Goddard unveiled the lyrics video for her debut single, "Marilyn", which is due to be released later in the year.

On 29 April 2014, it was announced that Goddard had signed a five-album record deal with Roc Nation.

== Discography ==
=== Singles ===
Year	Title	Chart peak positions		Album
Year	Title	UK	UK indie	Album
2010	"Turn My Swag On"	20	1	Non-album single
2014	"Marilyn"	–	–	Non-album single
2014	"So There"	67	–	Non-album single
2015	"We Broke the Sky"	–	–	Non-album single
2017	"Tears in Heaven"	–	–	Non-album single
2020	"Until You're Gone"	–	–	Non-album single
2020	"Run Away"	–	–	Non-album single

=== Other appearances ===
The following songs have been officially released, but do not feature on an album by Goddard.

Year	Song	Album	Notes
2009	"Child of the Night"	Night Castle	Collaboration with Trans-Siberian Orchestra

== See also ==
- List of YouTube personalities
