= Thali (disambiguation) =

Thali is a platter and a type of meal in South Asia.

Thali may also refer to:

- Puja thali, in Hindu rituals
- Thali (percussion), a musical instrument of Indian folk music
- Mangala sutra, or thali, a necklace used in the Hindu wedding ritual
- Thali dialect, a Saraiki dialect of Pakistan, as spoken in the Thal Desert
- Thali, a dialect of the Marwari language of India, as spoken in the Thar Desert
- Thali, a locality in Daanchhi, Kageshwari-Manohara Municipality, Kathmandu District, Nepal

== See also ==
- Tali (disambiguation)
- Thaali (disambiguation)
- Thal (disambiguation)
- Thari (disambiguation)
- Thallus, pl. thalli, the plant body of algae and lichens
- Thally, a village in Tamil Nadu, India
  - Thalli (State Assembly Constituency)
- Tahli (disambiguation)
