= Cholistani sheep =

Breed of sheep

The Cholistani is a breed of domestic sheep from Punjab, Pakistan. Though the Cholistani grows wool, it is raised primarily for meat.

== Characteristics ==
This breed has a black to brown head and ears, with a white body. It has small, stubby ears and is locally called 'Buchi'. The Cholistani has a long tail.

Mature rams weigh 48.5 kg (107 lb) and ewes weigh 34 kg (75 lb). On average, the height at the withers of mature rams is 75 cm (30 in) and ewes is 66 cm (26 in). At birth, on average, rams weigh 3.5 kg (7.7 lb) and ewes weigh 3.0 kg (6.6 lb).

Ewes have an average litter size of 1.05 lambs. During an average lactation cycle of 110 days, ewes produce 45 kg (99 lb) of milk.

From 1986 to 1996, the world population of the Cholistani decreased from 275,964 to 33,025. In 1986, there were an average of 120 per flock and artificial insemination was not used.
