= Vitalij Kuprij =

Ukrainian-American musician and composer (1974–2024)

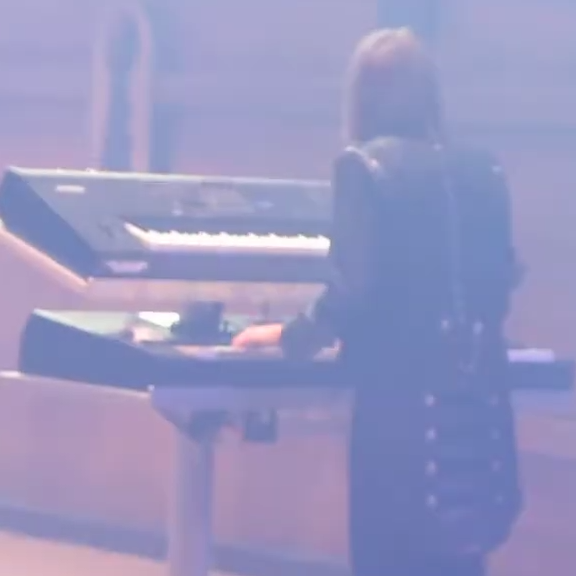
- Kuprij with Trans-Siberian Orchestra in 2014

Background information
- Born: July 7, 1974; Volodarka, Ukraine
- Died: February 20, 2024 (aged 49)
- Genres: Neo-classical metal; power metal; progressive metal; classical
- Occupations: Musician; composer
- Instruments: Piano; keyboards
- Years active: 1995–2024
- Formerly of: Ring of Fire; Trans-Siberian Orchestra; James Galway; Savatage; Artension

Vitalij Kuprij (July 7, 1974 – February 20, 2024) was a Ukrainian-American pianist, composer and music teacher. He was a keyboardist for Ring of Fire and Trans-Siberian Orchestra. He resided in Reading, Pennsylvania.

== Early life ==
Vitalij began piano studies at Kyiv's Mykola Lysenko Music Academy where he studied with Professor Nina Najditsch. In 1995, Mr Kuprij was sent to the United States upon recommendation by Sir James Galway to study with pianist Gary Graffman, President and Director of Curtis Institute of Music in Philadelphia. From Curtis, while on full scholarship, he obtained another degree and graduated in 2000.

== Career ==
James Galway chose Kuprij as his accompanist for the International Flute Seminar Master Classes held in Switzerland and for work on an international tour. Galway and Vitalij were on National Public Radio in the United States when Galway played a world-premier of one of his original compositions written for piano and flute. Soon thereafter, Vitalij was featured on WRTI for an hour broadcast from Philadelphia titled "Crossover with Jill Pasternak".

On March 7, 1999, Vitalij was selected as the soloist to perform the "Liszt Piano Concerto No. 1" with the New York Youth Symphony at Carnegie Hall, followed by performances at the Alice Tully Hall and Avery Fisher Hall.

After performing his Carnegie Hall solo debut in 2006, Kuprij was featured in a two-page spread in the New York Times written by arts and entertainment writer Dan Wakin.

During the summer of 2007, Vitalij appeared at Mexico's "Music Fest" in Mexico City.

=== Trans-Siberian Orchestra ===
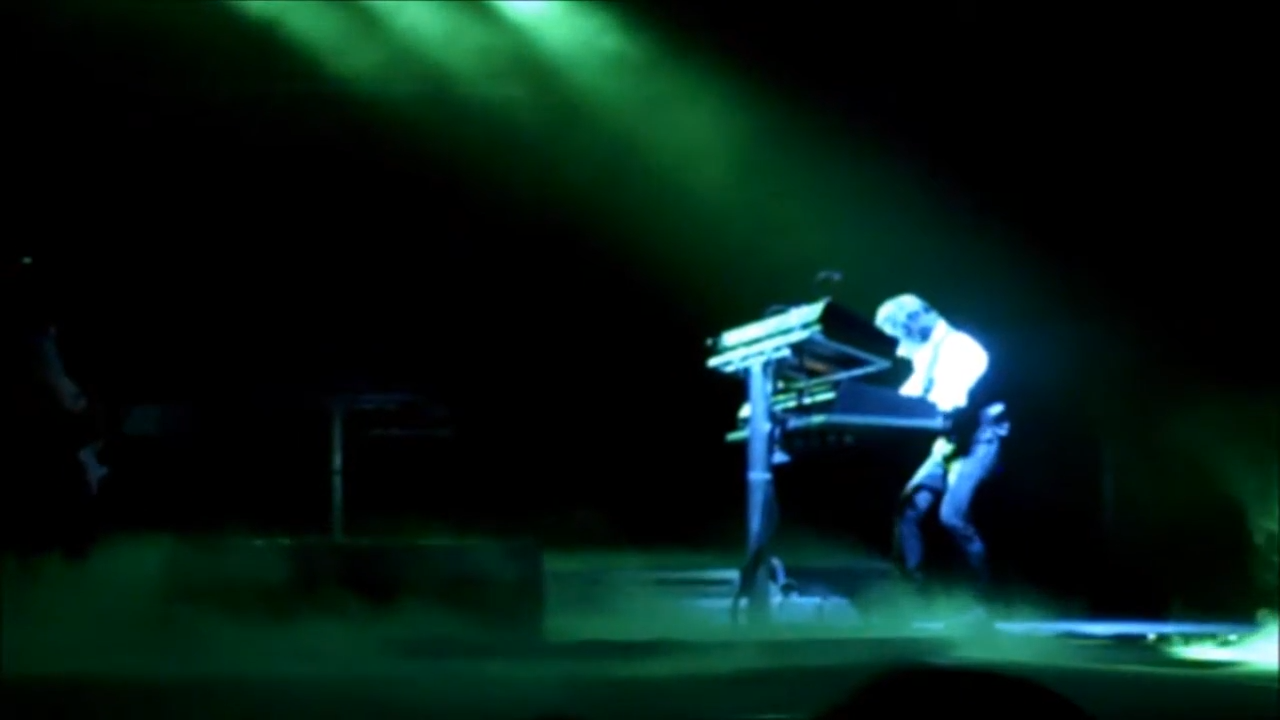
Kuprij playing a piano solo with Trans-Siberian Orchestra in 2014.

In 2009, he joined the progressive metal band Trans-Siberian Orchestra as a pianist/keyboard player and was hired back for each subsequent tour until December 2023. He has toured extensively with TSO in North America and Europe. Vitalij appears on TSO's first EP, Dreams of Fireflies (On a Christmas Night), released in 2012, playing piano on "Winter Palace" and "Time You Should be Sleeping". Vitalij received a writing credit for "King Rurik", a song from Trans-Siberian Orchestra's Letters from the Labyrinth album. He was also featured as additional keyboardist of Savatage during its 2015 Wacken reunion show.

=== 2Cellos ===
In 2017, he joined 2Cellos as keyboardist for their 2017-2018 North American tours.

== Death ==
On February 22, 2024, the Trans Siberian Orchestra confirmed that Kuprij had died on February 20. The cause of death was cardiac arrest as confirmed by Kuprij's wife via Facebook post on the same day. Savatage and Trans Siberian Orchestra vocalist Zak Stevens paid tribute, saying "There is no such thing as replacing a spirit like him".

== Discography ==
=== Solo albums ===
- High Definition (1997)
- Extreme Measures (1998)
- VK3 (1999)
- Works of Liszt and Chopin (2001)
- Forward and Beyond (2004)
- The Modern European Tradition (2005)
- Revenge (2005)
- Glacial Inferno (2007)
- Glacial Inferno & Revenge (compilation, 2007)
- 12 Months of the Year (2008)
- Journeys (2017)
- Bridges (with Gary Ginsberg, 2019)
- Progression (2020)

=== Greg Howe ===
- Ascend (1999)

=== Ferrigno•Leal•Kuprij ===
- Promised Land (2003)

=== Ring of Fire ===
- The Oracle (2001)
- Burning Live in Tokyo (2002)
- Dreamtower (2003)
- Battle of Leningrad (2014)

=== Artension ===
- Into the Eye of the Storm (1996)
- Phoenix Rising (1997)
- Forces of Nature (1999)
- Machine (2000)
- Sacred Pathways (2001)
- New Discovery (2002)
- Future World (2004)

=== Trans-Siberian Orchestra ===
- Dreams of Fireflies (On a Christmas Night) (2012)
- Letters from the Labyrinth (2015)
