= Ust-Tary =

Ust-Tary Усть-Тары
- Village
- Location within Perm Krai Location within Russia
- Coordinates: 57°56′N 55°51′E
- Country: Russia
- Region: Perm Krai
- District: Permsky District
- Time zone: UTC+5:00

Ust-Tary (Russian: Усть-Тары) is a rural locality (a village) in Kultayevskoye Rural Settlement, Permsky District, Perm Krai, Russia. The population was 198 as of 2010. There are 24 streets.

== Geography ==
Ust-Tary is located 29 km southwest of Perm (the district's administrative centre) by road. Pishchalnikovo is the nearest rural locality.
