= Plush (band) =

American rock band

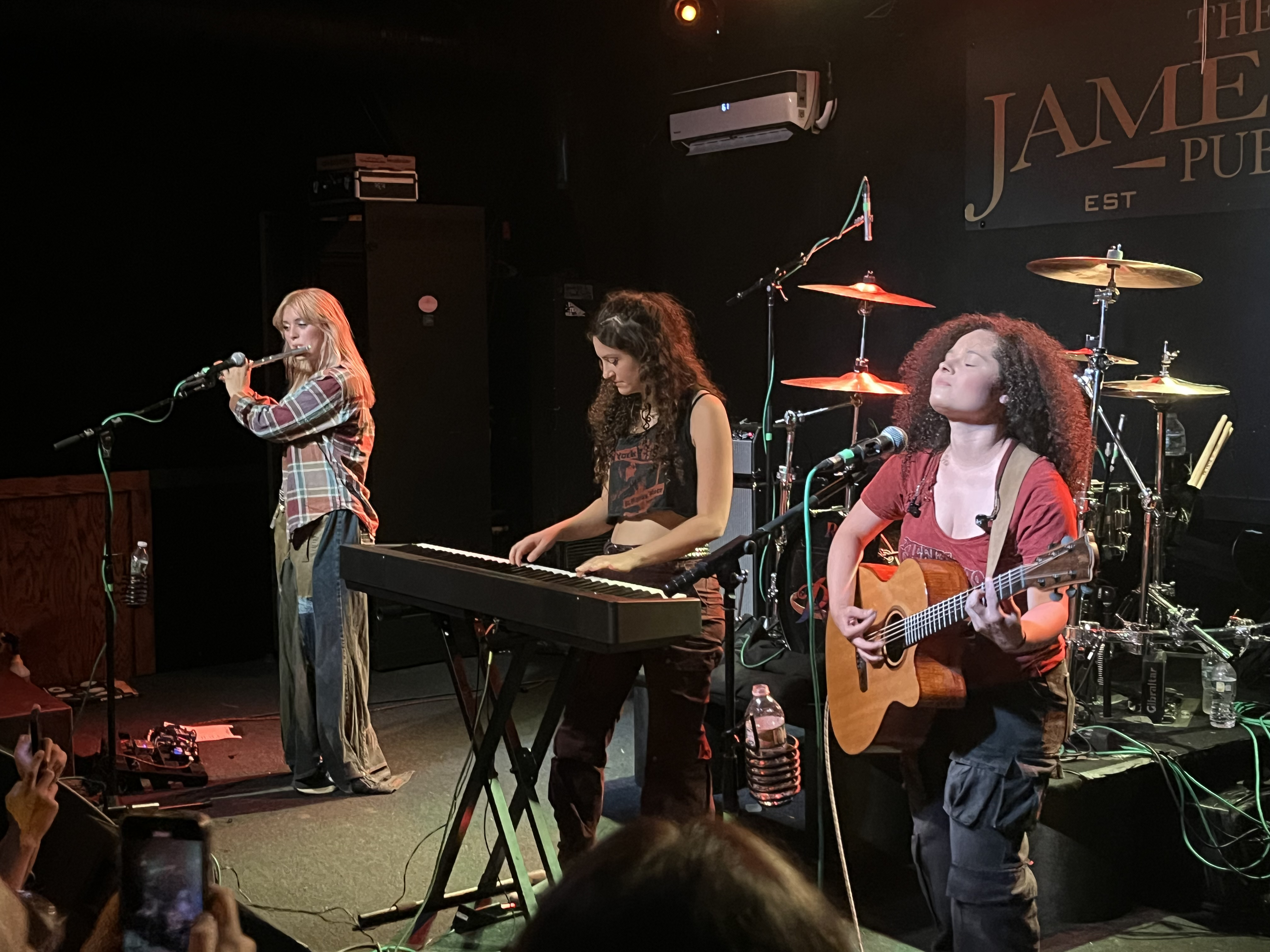
- Plush performing in Watertown, Connecticut, in 2025. From left: Ashley Suppa, Faith Powell, Moriah Formica

Background information
- Origin: Albany, New York, US
- Genres: Hard rock, heavy metal, alternative metal, grunge
- Years active: 2020–present
- Label: Pavement Entertainment
- Members: Moriah Formica; Ashley Suppa; Faith Powell
- Past members: Brooke Colucci; Bella Perron
- Website: www.plushrocks.net

Plush is an American rock band formed in Albany, New York in 2020.

== History ==
=== Formation ===
In April of 2020 during the COVID lockdowns, singer/songwriter/guitarist Moriah Formica and drummer Brooke Colucci made their first collaboration remotely from their homes, performing the song "Barracuda" by Heart. Moriah, who had been writing and recording music for years, gained a following when competing on season 13 of The Voice. Brooke (going by 'Brooke C.') had also gained a large internet following performing drum covers of various genres of music under the handle 'RockAngelBLC'.

After the positive response to the "Barracuda" video, (7M views) Brooke brought in guitarist-turned-bassist Ashley Suppa, whom she met at the School of Rock program. Bella Perron, who was studying guitar at Berklee, responded to an ad on Instagram for a band looking for lead guitarist. She was put in touch with Moriah via Lzzy Hale of Halestorm.

With the lineup set, Plush signed with Chicago record label Pavement Entertainment via Surface Management.

=== 2021–2022: "Hate", debut album and tour ===
Their first single "Hate" (a song previously recorded solo by Moriah) was released on February 9, 2021 and made its way to #24 on the Billboard Mainstream Rock chart. It continued to chart for 17 weeks and remains their highest charting single to date.

Plush played their first live show July 31, 2021 opening for Daughtry in Kettering, OH. They also spent the first portion of the tour opening for Seether and Mammoth WVH. The official release of their self-titled debut album Plush was October 29, 2021. The second leg of the tour they opened for Halestorm and Evanescence, and Sevendust.

Following the debut album release party at Empire Underground in Moriah's hometown Albany, NY, the band continued touring, opening shows for Slash w. Myles Kennedy and the Conspirators as well as Sevendust.

In between opening gigs, Plush made appearances at festivals like UFest, Rockville Daytona, Lunatic Luau, and Louder Than Life.

August 16, it was announced that Brooke C. would be leaving the band. Faith Powell, an 18 yr old drummer from Phoenix, AZ joined the band and was able to learn the set list in time for their next show only 10 days later. The tour continued with supporting gigs with Alice In Chains, Breaking Benjamin and Bush.

Plush would join the Kiss Kruise XI on its 2nd week, sailing from Los Angeles to Cabo San Lucas, Mexico.

The remainder of the year (Nov 16 - Dec 30, 2022) Moriah joined Trans-Siberian Orchestra on their winter tour, providing vocals, while Ashley recorded a solo album of soul/dance infused pop music and released it on her own web page.

=== 2023–2024: Find the Beautiful EP and tour ===
In February 2023 the band began recording tracks for their Find the Beautiful EP. The disc would have 6 original songs and a new cover of Heart's "Barracuda", with Faith Powell on drums. The first single "Left Behind" was released on April 26 and reached #33 on the Mainstream Rock chart. Plush began their tour in support of the album doing 17 shows opening for the Warning and Holy Wars.

They continued to perform sharing the stage with bands like Collective Soul, Super400, Bush, PopEvil and Evanescence as well as several headlining shows and making appearances at Rockfest in Cadott, WI and Rocklahoma Festival in Pryor, OK.

Moriah participated in the charity benefit Kiss Cancer Goodbye II, (which included Ace Frehley and Bruce Kulick of Kiss as well as many others) before once again joining Trans-Siberian Orchestra on their winter tour.

Plush kicked off 2024 by joining Disturbed and Falling In Reverse. While on tour, Moriah partnered with David Draiman nightly for the duet "Don't Tell Me" (a part which was performed by Ann Wilson on the album). Plush's headlining tour lasted until September. Moriah would accompany TSO one more time and later that year it was announced Plush would release a live album of the 2024 tour.

=== 2025 ===
Plush released their first live album, Live USA '24, in early January. It contains 13 songs from their first 2 studio efforts, a cover of Heart's "Barracuda" and a mid-set musical band introduction called "Tidal Wave".

== Critical reception ==
Megan Cola of Trill Magazine stated that "For Gen Z fans and rock lovers alike, the band captures the raw energy of classic rock while delivering a fresh, modern twist" going on to say that "their sound is proof that the spirit of rock is alive and thriving in a new generation".

Brave Words and Bloody Knuckles stated that "[Fueled] by raw emotion, soaring vocals, crushing riffs and relentless power, “Why” dives into the trenches of humanity, heartbreak, destruction and resilience".

Blabbermouth.net stated that song "Athena" is "a jaw-dropping song that has electrified audiences during recent live performances across the United States".

Tara Low of Guitar Girl Magazine stated "Fusing the sounds of rock bands like Aerosmith, Evanescence, and Halestorm, they released their first single, "Hate", which is garnering rave reviews and airplay—most recently, SiriusXM Octane added the single to their playlist".

== Band members ==
=== Current members ===
- Moriah Formica – guitars, lead vocals (2020–present)
- Ashley Suppa – bass, backing vocals (2020–present)
- Faith Powell – drums (2022–present)

=== Former members ===
- Brooke Colucci – drums (2020–2022)
- Bella Perron – lead guitar, backing vocals (2020–2025)

== Discography ==
=== Studio albums ===
- Plush (2021)
- Mass Hysteria (2026)

=== Live albums ===
- Live USA '24 (2025)

=== EPs ===
- Find the Beautiful (2023)

=== Singles ===
Title	Year	Peak chart positions	Album
Title	Year	US Main.	Album
"Hate"	2021	24	Plush
"Better Off Alone"	2022	40	Plush
"Will Not Win"	2022	—	Plush
"Left Behind"	2023	33	Find the Beautiful EP
"Run"	2024	26	Find the Beautiful EP
"Why"	2025	—	Non-album single
"Animalistic"	2026	40	Mass Hysteria

=== Music videos ===
Song	Year	Director
"Hate"	2021	Unknown
"Better Off Alone"	2022	Dale "Rage" Resteghini
"Will Not Win"	2022	Unknown
"Left Behind"	2023	Dale "Rage" Resteghini
"Barracuda"	2024	Rock Hernandez, Mike Anderson, Dylan Yadav
"Hope It Hurts"	2024	Unknown
"Find the Beautiful"	2024	Matthew Breiter
"Run"	2024	Chase Warren
"Why"	2025	Chase Warren
"Animalistic"	2026	Unknown
