= Nate Amor =

American singer-songwriter

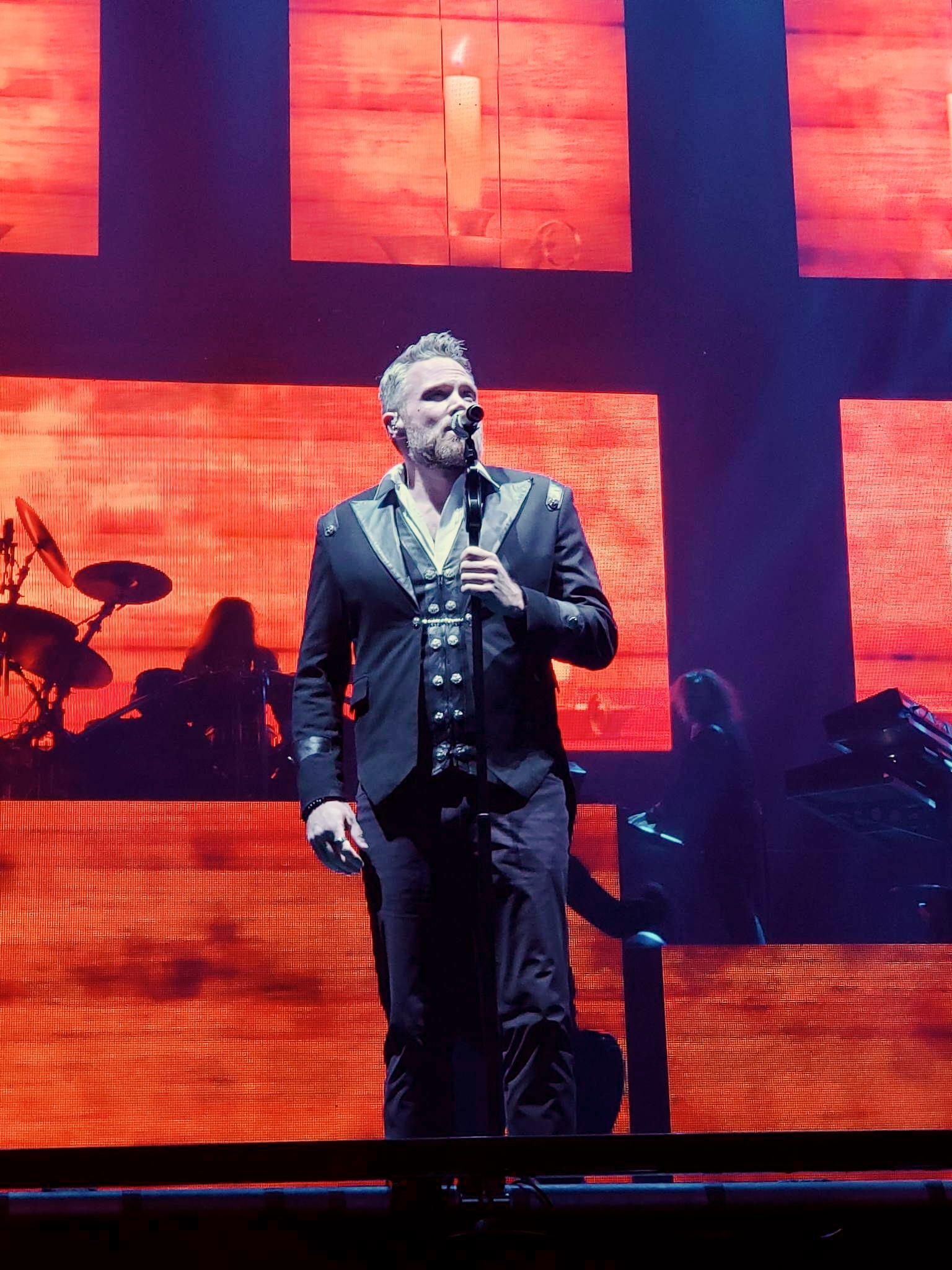
- Amor performing with Trans-Siberian Orchestra at Amalie Arena in 2022

Background information
- Born: Nathan Anderson; Saint Paul, Minnesota, U.S.
- Origin: Minneapolis, Minnesota, U.S.
- Genres: Americana; rock; singer-songwriter
- Occupations: Singer; songwriter
- Years active: 2001–present
- Label: Deadrock Records
- Website: nateamor.com

Nate Amor (born Nathan Anderson) is an American singer-songwriter and a touring vocalist with the Trans-Siberian Orchestra. Performing under his birth name, he appeared in a blind audition on the second season of NBC's The Voice in 2012. He has released music under both names, including the albums Long Five Days and Using Dreams as Nathan Anderson and Keep Dreaming as Nate Amor.

== Early life ==
Anderson was born in Saint Paul, Minnesota, and was adopted after spending several months in foster care. He spent part of his childhood in the Brainerd area before his family moved to the Minneapolis area when he was ten. He has said that he began singing along with Elvis Presley karaoke recordings as a teenager and won a high-school talent show with a performance of "In the Ghetto". Amor told BroadwayWorld that he later studied music therapy at the University of Minnesota and performed at venues near the campus.

== Career ==
=== Work as Nathan Anderson ===
Anderson began performing professionally in the Twin Cities club scene, where he spent much of his early career fronting cover bands while also writing original songs. Digital music services list his albums Long Five Days (2003) and Using Dreams (2007), followed by the singles "A Song for You" (2011) and "Search Me" (2016), under the name Nathan Anderson. His song "Sweet Misery" was licensed for the 2004 film Cruel Intentions 3. An archived 2009 page from the independent label Stella Mae Records listed Anderson as a featured artist and promoted Using Dreams.

In 2012, Anderson auditioned for the second season of The Voice with Marc Cohn's "Walking in Memphis". None of the four coaches selected him to advance.

=== Nate Amor and Trans-Siberian Orchestra ===
Anderson adopted the stage name Nate Amor around the beginning of his work with the Trans-Siberian Orchestra. He has explained that he chose the Spanish word for love to reflect themes of love, hope, and recovery in his music. He began touring as a vocalist with the ensemble in 2019 and has since performed lead and background vocal parts in its annual winter tours. Concert reviews have singled out his lead performances: a 2024 review of the ensemble's Anaheim concert praised his interpretation of "Believe", and a 2025 Orlando review highlighted his rendition of "Music Box Blues".

Amor relocated to the Los Angeles area in early 2022 and began releasing new material under the stage name. His 2023 releases included the album Keep Dreaming and the singles "Rodeo", "Mission Critical", "I Know Me", "Wash You Away", and "I Want You". Reviewing the full album for Americana Highways, John Apice discussed its themes of sobriety, loss, and coping, praised Amor's vocals and production, and highlighted seven of its ten tracks. Individual songs also received reviews in LADYGUNN, EARMILK, KALTBLUT Magazine, Too Much Love Magazine, and V13.

He released The Sunland Sessions and On the Run in 2024. In 2025, he released a recording of "Walking in Memphis", returning to the song he had performed on The Voice thirteen years earlier. By the end of that year he had moved from Los Angeles to Denver while continuing to tour with the Trans-Siberian Orchestra.

== Musical style ==
Amor's solo work combines Americana, rock, country, and pop. V13 characterized "I Want You" as a mixture of light rock and alternative country, while EARMILK described "Mission Critical" as combining acoustic guitars with electronic-pop production. Reviews have frequently noted his raspy or gravelly vocal style. His lyrics often draw on relationships, identity, and recovery.

== Discography ==
=== Studio albums ===
- Long Five Days (2003, as Nathan Anderson)
- Using Dreams (2007, as Nathan Anderson)
- Keep Dreaming (2023)
- The Sunland Sessions (2024)
- On the Run (2024)

=== Selected singles ===
- "A Song for You" (2011, as Nathan Anderson)
- "Search Me" (2016, as Nathan Anderson)
- "Rodeo" (2023)
- "Mission Critical" (2023)
- "I Know Me" (2023)
- "Wash You Away" (2023)
- "I Want You" (2023)
- "Forgetful" (with Kelsie Watts) (2024)
- "Walking in Memphis" (2025)
- "The Reason" (2026)
- "Dancing in the Rain" (2026)
- "All the Time" (2026)
