= Asha Mevlana =

American violinist and travel presenter

- Born: Asha Mevlana Clayton-Niederman
- Origin: Boston
- Genres: Rock; classical
- Occupation: Musician
- Instruments: Violin; viola
- Website: Official Asha Mevlana Website

Asha Mevlana (born Asha Mevlana Clayton-Niederman) is an American violinist and travel presenter. She is known for playing an electric 7-string viper violin and for performing with the Trans-Siberian Orchestra. She has released two albums with the string quartet Invert and one with the Australian rock band Porcelain.

== Biography ==
Mevlana attended the New England Conservatory Preparatory Division and went on to graduate from Wellesley College with a degree in viola performance. After graduation she moved to New York City, where she began working in public relations for Zagat Survey. In 1999 Mevlana was diagnosed with breast cancer at the age of 24. She underwent surgery, chemotherapy and radiation and left her job with Zagat and began working as a music teacher and as an outreach coordinator for the Young Survival Coalition. Mevlana was presented with the Gilda Radner Award by The Wellness Community in 2004.

== Career ==
While in New York and undergoing chemotherapy, Mevlana began performing with the alternative string quartet Invert, with whom she released two albums. In 2003 she moved to Los Angeles to pursue a career as an electric violinist and has since performed with artists such as Alanis Morissette, Enrique Iglesias, Roger Daltrey, Dee Snider and the Jonas Brothers. Mevlana has also performed Crazy with Gnarls Barkley. Mevlana's TV appearances include The Tonight Show with Jay Leno Show, The Ellen DeGeneres Show, Jimmy Kimmel Live, the Grammy Awards, the MTV Movie Awards and American Idol.

Mevlana was also part of Porcelain, an Australian rock band signed to Universal Records which toured around North America. In 2009 the band's first single, The Last Song, was named the Daily Telegraph's 'single of the week' and was aired on national radio in Australia. In 2011 Mevlana was hired as the string director and soloist for the Trans-Siberian Orchestra West Coast Tour and has toured around North America and Europe.

Mevlana has also worked as a director and her debut documentary short Driven was released in 2011. She was also featured in the Travel Channel pilots Lost Weekend and Destination Showdown as well as the Travel Presenter for Viator.com's web series.

Her "Amplified Tiny House" was featured on Tiny House Nation on March 4, 2017 on FYI Network.

== Discography ==
=== Albums with Invert ===
- Invert (2000)
- Between the Seconds (2003)

=== With Porcelain ===
==== Albums ====
- The Last Song (I'm Wasting On You) (2010)

==== Singles ====
- Again
- The Last Song (I'm Wasting On You)
