= Bart Shatto =

Broadway theatre actor-singer

Bart Shatto is a Broadway theatre actor-singer who has appeared in the Broadway musicals Les Misérables, The Civil War and Dracula, the Musical as well as the national tour of Cats. He was also in Cornstock Theatre's production of The Secret Garden. He is a veteran member of the rock band The Trans-Siberian Orchestra.

Shatto is from Peoria, Illinois, but lived in Bradford, Illinois during grade school. After his family moved back to Peoria, he attended Bergan High School (now Peoria Notre Dame High School). He resides in Secaucus, New Jersey.
