= Puran Rana Tharu =

Nepali politician

Puran Rana Tharu (Nepali: पुरण राना थारु) is a Nepalese politician, belonging to the Communist Party of Nepal (Maoist). In the 2008 Constituent Assembly election he was elected from the Kanchanpur-1 constituency, winning 14765 votes.

In the 2013 Constituent Assembly election Tharu was fielded as the 181st candidate on the proportional representation list of the Unified Communist Party of Nepal (Maoist).
