= There =

There may refer to:

- There (2009 film), a Turkish film (Turkish title: Orada)
- There (2025 film), a Russian comedy film
- There (virtual world)
- there, a deictic adverb in English
- there, an English pronoun used in phrases such as there is and there are
