= Angus Clark =

American musician

Angus Clark is a guitarist, singer, songwriter, and producer. He has toured with the internationally renowned and Grammy-winning New Age artist Kitaro and the hard rock acts Drill and Naked Sun. He is currently touring with the Trans-Siberian Orchestra and DareDevil Squadron. Clark is also an on-stage guitarist with the fictional 1980s rock band Arsenal in the Broadway musical Rock of Ages.

His stage performance on the Kitaro 1999 concert DVD "An Enchanted Evening" clearly demonstrates his unique talent and skill. IE: Kokoro

His first solo album, "Grace Period", was released in 2004. The album also served as his debut as a lead singer.

In 2006, he produced and played guitar for his band Trouble Club's debut EP, "The Unbreakable Heart". Also in 2006, he co-wrote and played guitar on Jethro Tull and TSO violinist Anna Phoebe's debut albumette "Gypsy". Jethro Tull performed two songs co-written by Clark while on tour in Europe. His wife's name is Bonnie, and they have 2 cats. They live in Brooklyn.

In 2009, he released his first instrumental album, Your Last Battlefield

Clark is also one of two guitarists in the band DareDevil Squadron, and they released their first album, "Out of the Sun", in 2010. They have toured sporadically in 2010 and 2011. In March 2011, the band followed up their first album with a cover version of Mumford and Son's Little Lion Man.

Clark also teaches at the National Guitar Workshop, a music school in the United States.
