= Machines of Grace =

American hard rock band

- Origin: Boston, Massachusetts, U.S.
- Genres: Hard rock
- Years active: 2009–present
- Members: Zachary Stevens; Jeff Plate; Matt Leff; Chris Rapoza
- Website: machinesofgrace.net

Machines of Grace is an American hard rock band from Boston, Massachusetts. The band features two former members of Savatage, namely vocalist Zachary Stevens and drummer Jeff Plate. Stevens is also the vocalist for Circle II Circle and Jeff Plate is the drummer for the Trans-Siberian Orchestra, Metal Church and violinist Mark Wood. The band plays varied genres of hard rock including heavy metal, acoustic rock, and melodic metal.

== History ==
For a period of eight years, from 1992 until 2000, Stevens and Plate were members of Savatage. After four albums and several world tours with the group, Stevens left citing family reasons. During the winter of 2002, Stevens started his own band called Circle II Circle, co-writing with former Savatage lead singer Jon Oliva and guitarist Chris Caffery. The remaining members of Savatage eventually turned into the Trans-Siberian Orchestra, of which Jeff Plate is a founding member and is currently the east coast band's drummer.

Stevens and Plate played in a band called Wicked Witch previously. With Mark Stewart on bass Boston native guitarist Matt Leff. Matt and Stevens first met while attending Musicians Institute in Hollywood, California. Upon graduating they moved to Boston and met Plate. These three musicians have reunited under the band name "Machines of Grace". When it was time to bring in a bassist, Chris Rapoza was called. Leff and Rapoza played together for several years in the Boston area metal band "Trigger Effect". Trigger Effect was chosen as one of the top unsigned bands in the United States by Sam Goody Record Stores, worked with producer Neil Kernon, and toured the Northeast as an opening act for Iron Maiden, Queensrÿche and Rob Halford.

When 13 songs were ready to be recorded for the Machines of Grace album, producer/engineer Paul David Hager was brought in. The album was recorded at Pyramid Sound in Ithaca, New York; Studio Metronome in Nashua, New Hampshire; Red Room Recorders in Tampa, Florida; and 37' Productions in Rockland, Massachusetts. It was mixed at Skip Saylor Studios in Hollywood, California and mastered at Sterling Sound in New York City. The band released the album worldwide in the summer of 2009 and plays live sporadically.

== Band members ==
- Zachary Stevens − vocals
- Jeff Plate − drums
- Matt Leff − guitars (died)
- Chris Rapoza − bass

== Discography ==
=== Studio albums ===
- Machines of Grace (2009)

== See also ==
- Savatage − Stevens sung lead vocals on four studio albums, Plate played drums on three studio albums.
- Trans-Siberian Orchestra − Stevens and Plate tour with the group
- Metal Church - Plate was the drummer
- Circle II Circle − Stevens is the singer
