= 'Tage Mahal =

Studio album by Jon Oliva's Pain
- Released: October 25, 2004
- Recorded: 2004
- Genre: Heavy metal
- Length: 62:37
- Label: SPV/Steamhammer
- Producers: Jon Oliva, Paul O'Neill

Jon Oliva's Pain chronology
'Tage Mahal (2004)	Straight Jacket Memoirs (2006)

'Tage Mahal is a 2004 release by Jon Oliva's Pain. It was the first non-Savatage related release by Jon Oliva since 1994's Doctor Butcher.

Ironically, just like Savatage, the band faced a problem with its name. Oliva originally wanted to call the band 'Tage Mahal, as a homage to Savatage, although Oliva admits he could have called the band "Savatage, or Jon Oliva's Savatage, or Savatage Lite, but I didn't do that out of respect for the guys that were in Savatage."

Prior to the album's release, Oliva discovered a blues musician Taj Mahal. Under the Consumer Confusion law, the album would have been pulled off the shelves, despite the 'Tage spelling. Instead of holding the record up thinking of a new title, Oliva instructed SPV to simply swap the titles around.

Oliva noted the album was "received great, but it sold shit because the record company didn't do anything with it" because Oliva believes the label wanted a new Savatage record, but both Oliva and long-time producer, Paul O'Neill said no. As a result, on the band's 2006 and 2007 tours, the band has not performed songs from the album as part of their set.

The only song on the album not credited solely to Oliva, "The Nonsensible Ravings of the Lunatic Mind", which was co-written by Savatage guitarist Chris Caffery, is an outtake from Savatage's most recent release, 2001's Poets and Madmen.

== Track listing ==
All music is composed by Jon Oliva, except where noted.

No.	Title	Length
1.	"The Dark"	5:11
2.	"People Say – Gimme Some Hell"	4:08
3.	"Guardian of Forever"	7:44
4.	"Slipping Away"	4:29
5.	"Walk Alone"	4:32
6.	"The Nonsensible Ravings of the Lunatic Mind" (Oliva, Chris Caffery)	5:31
7.	"No Escape"	3:23
8.	"Father, Son, Holy Ghost"	5:54
9.	"All the Time"	4:58
10.	"Nowhere to Run"	5:23
11.	"Pain"	3:13
12.	"Outside the Door"	4:00
13.	"Fly Away"	4:11

== Personnel ==
- Jon Oliva – lead vocals, keyboards, guitars
- Matt LaPorte – guitars
- Kevin Rothney – bass
- John Zahner – keyboards
- Christopher Kinder – drums

Additional musicians

- Steve Wacholz – drums on "No Escape" and "Nowhere to Run"
