= Stranger in Us All =

Studio album by Rainbow
- Released: 11 September 1995
- Recorded: 1995
- Studio: Long View Farm (Brookfield, Massachusetts); Cove City Sound (Long Island, New York); Sound on Sound; Unique; Soundtrack (New York City)
- Genre: Hard rock
- Length: 51:44
- Label: RCA
- Producer: Pat Regan; Ritchie Blackmore

Rainbow chronology
Bent Out of Shape (1983)	Stranger in Us All (1995)

Professional ratings
Review scores
Source	Rating
AllMusic	3/5 stars
Collector's Guide to Heavy Metal	6/10

Stranger in Us All is the eighth and final studio album by the British hard rock band Rainbow, released on 11 September 1995 by RCA Records. This was the band's first studio album in twelve years, and originally intended to be a solo album by Ritchie Blackmore, but due to pressures from BMG, it was billed as Ritchie Blackmore's Rainbow, which saw him putting together a new line-up featuring himself and four then-unknown musicians: vocalist Doogie White, bassist Greg Smith, keyboardist Paul Morris and drummer John O'Reilly.

As Blackmore decided to pursue different musical styles (forming Blackmore's Night with his companion Candice Night), Stranger in Us All was his final recording as a rock artist for two decades, until he put together a reincarnation of Rainbow in 2016 and released a series of new singles. The album takes its name from a line in the song "Black Masquerade".

Released during the post-grunge scene of the mid-1990s, Stranger in Us All failed to measure up to the critical and commercial acclaim of previous releases and was not particularly well publicized. However, it achieved modest success, particularly in Europe and Japan.

== Promotion ==
Much of the album was featured in the band's live concert sets. Drummer John O'Reilly was replaced for the tour by the returning Chuck Burgi. John Miceli joined the band for the U.S. shows, from February to May 1997, plus one in Denmark. A live performance recorded at Philipshalle Düsseldorf for German TV show Rockpalast on October 9, 1995, was released on the DVD Black Masquerade in 2013.

A few songs off the album were played live by the band Over the Rainbow in 2008 and 2009, as the line-up featured Greg Smith and Paul Morris, who played in Rainbow in 1995.

The songs have been also performed occasionally by Doogie White, for example in 2004 with a band called White Noise, and 2010 presentations with Rata Blanca. An official DVD recording of White Noise titled In the Hall of the Mountain King was released in 2004. The song "Ariel" was performed live by Blackmore's Night on their 2007 Paris Moon tour.

== Track listing ==
No.	Title	Writer(s)	Length
1.	"Wolf to the Moon"	Ritchie Blackmore, Doogie White, Candice Night	4:16
2.	"Cold Hearted Woman"	Blackmore, White	4:31
3.	"Hunting Humans (Insatiable)"	Blackmore, White	5:45
4.	"Stand and Fight"	Blackmore, White	5:22
5.	"Ariel"	Blackmore, Night	5:39
6.	"Too Late for Tears"	Blackmore, White, Pat Regan	4:50
7.	"Black Masquerade"	Blackmore, Paul Morris, White, Night	5:35
8.	"Silence"	Blackmore, White	4:04
9.	"Hall of the Mountain King"	Edvard Grieg, lyrics by Night, arrangement by Blackmore	5:34
10.	"Still I'm Sad" (The Yardbirds cover)	Paul Samwell-Smith, Jim McCarty	5:22

Japanese edition bonus track
No.	Title	Writer(s)	Length
11.	"Emotional Crime"	Blackmore, White, Regan	3:49

- Track 10 was originally recorded by The Yardbirds on the album Having a Rave Up with The Yardbirds. The song was previously covered as an instrumental by the Dio-era Rainbow on Ritchie Blackmore's Rainbow and with vocals on Rainbow on Stage and other live albums.

== Personnel ==
Rainbow

- Ritchie Blackmore – guitars, producer
- Doogie White – vocals
- Greg Smith – bass, backing vocals
- Paul Morris – keyboards
- John O'Reilly – drums

Additional musicians

- Candice Night – backing vocals
- Mitch Weiss – harmonica

Production

- Pat Regan – producer, engineer, mixing
- Fran Flannery, Jesse Henderson, Ed Miller, Steve Moseley, John Reigart, David Shackney, Steve Sisco and Dug – assistant engineers
- Vlado Meller – mastering at Sony Music Studios, New York

== Charts ==
Chart (1995)	Peak position
Dutch Albums (Album Top 100)	70
Finnish Albums (Suomen virallinen lista)	6
German Albums (Offizielle Top 100)	36
Japanese Albums (Oricon)	7
Norwegian Albums (VG-lista)	38
Swedish Albums (Sverigetopplistan)	8
Swiss Albums (Schweizer Hitparade)	40
UK Albums (OCC)	102

== Certifications ==
Region	Certification	Certified units/sales
Japan (RIAJ)	Gold	100,000^{^}
^{^} Shipments figures based on certification alone.
