= Festival (Jon Oliva's Pain album) =

Studio album by Jon Oliva's Pain
- Released: February 19, 2010 (Europe); April 12, 2010 (North America)
- Recorded: 2009
- Genre: Heavy metal
- Length: 55:05 (standard edition); 58:44 (limited edition)
- Label: AFM Records
- Producers: Christopher Kinder; Jon Oliva; Tom Morris

Jon Oliva's Pain chronology
| Global Warning (2008) | Festival (2010) |

Professional ratings
Review scores
| Source | Rating |
|---|---|
| Jukebox:Metal | 4/5 stars |

Festival is the fourth and final release by the band Jon Oliva's Pain. Released in February 2010 in Europe, it peaked at number 87 in the German MRC Radio Charts.

The record continues in using the works of the late Criss Oliva, the younger brother of the band's founder, Jon, like the two previous JOP albums. The track "Living on the Edge" is a reworking of a Savatage track that featured on bootleg records of the band.

== Track listing ==
| No. | Title | Writer(s) | Length |
|---|---|---|---|
| 1. | "Lies" | Criss Oliva, Jon Oliva, Matt LaPorte | 6:19 |
| 2. | "Death Rides a Black Horse" | Jon Oliva, | 6:15 |
| 3. | "Festival" | Criss Oliva, Jon Oliva | 4:59 |
| 4. | "Afterglow" | Jon Oliva | 6:50 |
| 5. | "Living on the Edge" | Criss Oliva, Jon Oliva, Matt LaPorte | 5:10 |
| 6. | "Looking for Nothing" | Jon Oliva | 3:05 |
| 7. | "The Evil Within" | Jon Oliva, Matt Laporte | 5:15 |
| 8. | "Winter Haven" | Criss Oliva, Jon Oliva | 7:38 |
| 9. | "I Fear You" | Jon Oliva | 5:11 |
| 10. | "Now" | Jon Oliva | 4:23 |

Limited edition
| No. | Title | Writer(s) | Length |
|---|---|---|---|
| 11. | "Peace" | Jon Oliva | 3:39 |

== Personnel ==
- Jon Oliva – lead vocals, piano, guitars, keyboards
- Christopher Kinder – drums, percussion, vocals
- Kevin Rothney – bass, vocals
- Matt LaPorte – lead guitars, hammered dulcimer, vocals
- Tom McDyne – guitars, vocals

=== Additional musicians ===
- Howard Helm – piano and keyboards
- Casey Grillo – percussion
- Tom Morris – guitar
- Jim Morris – guitar
- Laurian Mohai – guitar
- Jason Blackerby – percussion
- Dana Piper – guitar
- Todd La Torre – backing vocals, hammered dulcimer on "Afterglow"

=== Further credits ===
- Produced by Christopher Kinder, Jon Oliva and Tom Morris
- Recorded at Morrisound Studios in Tampa, Florida and Shabbey Road Studios in Dunedin, Florida
- Engineered by Tom Morris, Christopher Kinder and Jason Blackerby
- Mixed by Tom Morris
- Mastered by Tom Morris and Christopher Kinder
- Orchestration: Jon Oliva, Howard Helm, Tom Morris and Christopher Kinder
- The Scarlett Pumpernickel Choir: Jesse Morris, Todd La Torre, Jason Blackerby, Kevin Rothney, Christopher Kinder, Tom McDyne and Matt LaPorte
- Art concept: Jon Oliva, Christopher Kinder
- CD artwork design by Thomas Ewerhard
- Photography by Eric Franguel
