= Pins and Needles (Chris Caffery album) =

Studio album by Chris Caffery
- Released: 23 March 2007
- Recorded: Hot Tracks Studio, Spin Studios, Happy Beaver Studios, February–October 2006
- Genre: Heavy metal
- Length: 62:18
- Label: Metal Heaven Records
- Producer: Nik Chinboukas, Chris Caffery

Chris Caffery chronology
W.A.R.P.E.D. (2005)	Pins and Needles (2007)	House of Insanity (2008)

Pins and Needles is a 2007 album by Savatage guitarist Chris Caffery.

== Track listing ==
1. "Pins and Needles" (Chris Caffery) - 4:47
2. "66" (Caffery) - 4:40
3. "Reach Out and Torment Again" (Caffery, Nik Chinboukas) - 3:35
4. "Walls" (Caffery, Chinboukas) - 5:35
5. "Y.G.B.F.K.M." (Caffery) - 4:08
6. "It's S-A-D" (Caffery, Chinboukas, Jon Oliva) - 4:43
7. "Chained" (Caffery, Chinboukas) - 4:40
8. "WORMS" (Caffery) - 4:08
9. "The Sign of the Crossed" (Caffery, Chinboukas) - 4:14
10. "The Time" (Caffery, Chinboukas) - 3:25
11. "Mettle Eastern" (Caffery) - 4:12
12. "In the Midst" (Caffery) - 2:10
13. "Quaaludio" (Caffery) - 1:35
14. "The Temple" (Caffery, Chinboukas) - 5:34
15. "Once Upon a Time" (Caffery, Paul Morris) - 4:52 (limited edition bonus track)

== Credits ==
- Chris Caffery - all vocals, all guitars, bass guitars, keyboards, sax solo on "Worms", additional percussion, producer, engineer
- Yael - drums
- Nick Douglas - bass guitars
- Paul Morris - piano, keyboards
- Dave Eggar - cello, string arrangements
- Phil Caffery - drums on "Once Upon a Time"
- Lucia Micarelli - violin on "Mettle East"
- Rachel - violin on "Once Upon a Time"
- Ferdy Doernberg - keyboard solo on "Mettle East"
- Alex Skolnick - ending guitar solo on "It's SAD"
- Marcus DeLoach - opera vocals on "The Time"
- Paul LaPlaca - additional keyboards, engineer
- Nik Chinboukas - additional keyboards, additional drums, producer, engineer, mixing
- Roger Lian - mastering at Masterdisk, New York City
- Seth Siro Anton – artwork
