= Journeyman (disambiguation) =

A journeyman is a tradesman or craftsman who has completed an apprenticeship, but is not yet a Master tradesman.

Journeyman may also refer to:

== TV and games ==
- Journeyman (TV series), a 2007 American science fiction television drama
- The Journeyman Project a science fiction adventure game series

== Film ==
- Journeyman (film), a 2017 UK film
- Journeyman Pictures (US), a film production company founded by Paul Mezey
- Journeyman Pictures, a film distribution company founded by Mark Stucke

== Music ==
- Journeyman (album), a 1989 album by Eric Clapton
- The Journeymen, a folk music trio of John Phillips, Scott McKenzie and Dick Weissman
- "Journeyman", recording name of Paul Frankland (a.k.a. Woob) and Colin Waterton
- Journey, Man!, a 1996 album by trumpeter Jack Walrath

=== Songs ===
- "Journeyman", a song from Jethro Tull's 1978 album Heavy Horses
- "Journeyman", a song from Praying Mantis' 1993 album A Cry for the New World
- "Journeyman", a song from Iron Maiden's 2003 album Dance of Death
- "Journeyman", a song from Amon Tobin's 2011 album ISAM
- "Journeyman", a song from Blackmore's Night's 2012 album A Knight In York
- "Journey Man", a song from Korpiklaani's 2005 album Voice of Wilderness

== Other uses ==
- Journeyman (boxing), a fighter who has adequate boxing skill, but does not have the caliber of a contender or gatekeeper
- Journeyman (sports), an athlete or professional sports player who is technically competent, but unable to excel or one who plays for many different teams over the course of a career
- Journeyman (pro wrestling), a type of jobber
- Journeyman quarterback, in professional American football, is a quarterback who plays short stints for several teams over a career.
- Journeyman, a 1935 novel by Erskine Caldwell
