= Straight Jacket Memoirs =

EP by Jon Oliva's Pain
- Released: June 23, 2006
- Recorded: 2005–2006
- Genre: Heavy metal
- Length: 22:37
- Label: AFM Records
- Producers: Jon Oliva, Paul O'Neill

Jon Oliva's Pain chronology
'Tage Mahal (2004)	Straight Jacket Memoirs (2006)	Maniacal Renderings (2006)

Straight Jacket Memoirs is a 2006 EP by Jon Oliva's Pain. Distributed by AFM Records, it was the first release by the band for their new label. The release featured two new full songs from the then forthcoming album, Maniacal Renderings, and live renditions of two songs from the band's previous album, 'Tage Mahal. The other track featured on the release is an edited version of the song "The Evil Beside You".

== Track listing ==
No.	Title	Writer(s)	Length
1.	"The Evil Beside You (Edited Version)"	Criss Oliva, Jon Oliva	3:24
2.	"Time to Die"	Criss Oliva, Jon Oliva, Matt LaPorte	4:23
3.	"The Evil Beside You (Album Version)"	Criss Oliva, Jon Oliva	4:52
4.	"The Dark (Live)"	Jon Oliva	5:54
5.	"People Say - Gimme Some Hell (Live)"	Jon Oliva	4:04

== Personnel ==
- Jon Oliva – lead vocals, keyboards
- Matt LaPorte – guitars
- Shane French – guitars
- Kevin Rothney – bass, backing vocals
- John Zahner – keyboards
- Christopher Kinder – drums
