= Jeff Plate =

American drummer (born 1962)

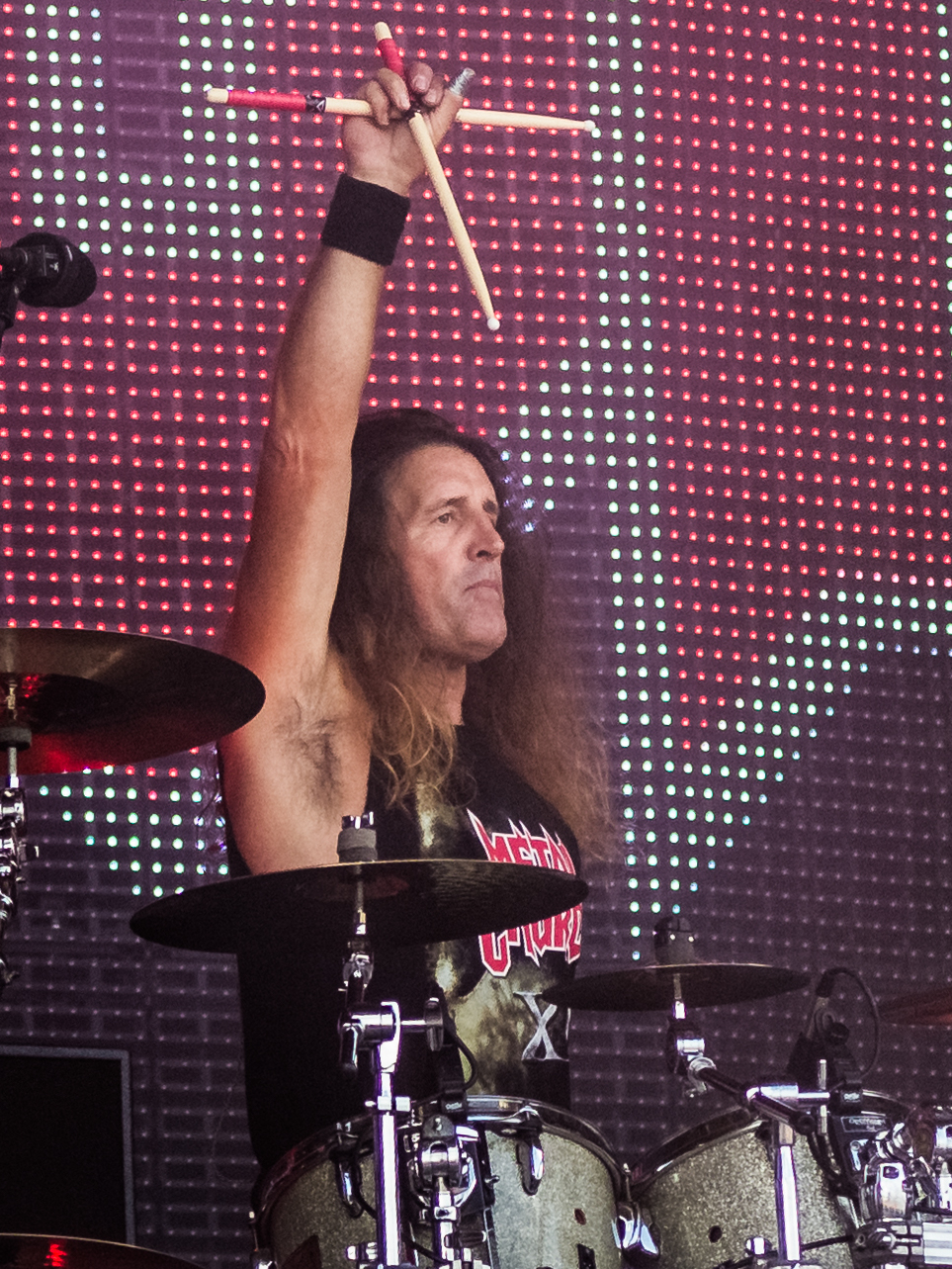
- Plate with Metal Church at Wacken Open Air 2016

Background information
- Born: March 26, 1962 (age 64); Montour Falls, New York, U.S.
- Genres: Heavy metal, progressive metal, power metal
- Occupation: Drummer
- Years active: 1995–present
- Member of: Savatage, Trans-Siberian Orchestra, Machines of Grace
- Formerly of: Doctor Butcher, Metal Church, John West
- Website: jeffplate.com

Jeff Plate (born March 26, 1962) is an American heavy metal drummer who has been a member of Savatage since 1994. He is also a member of Trans-Siberian Orchestra and a former member of Metal Church from 2006 to their break up in 2009 and again from their reunion in 2012 to 2017.

== Life and career ==
Plate was born in Montour Falls, New York, and grew up on a farm in Horseheads, New York. As a youth, he dreamed of becoming a pitcher for the New York Yankees, but his plans were halted when his hip popped out of joint at the age of 12. On crutches for 4 months, he was advised to give up playing sports for two years so the hip could heal properly. After watching Kiss perform on The Midnight Special, he began taking drum lessons. Jeff moved to Tampa, Florida, in 1981, but soon returned New York, before moving once again to the Boston area. There, while working in a cover band with some hometown friends, he met Boston guitarist Matt Leff. Leff had been playing in a band Wicked Witch, whose lead vocalist was Zak Stevens.

In the fall of 1992, Zak got the call to join Savatage, replacing recently departed Jon Oliva. Zak accepted and made his Savatage debut on 1993's Edge of Thorns. Wicked Witch folded soon after, as they couldn't get a replacement for Stevens. In 1993, Plate moved back to upstate New York to regroup, joining a country rock band called Voodoo Rodeo.

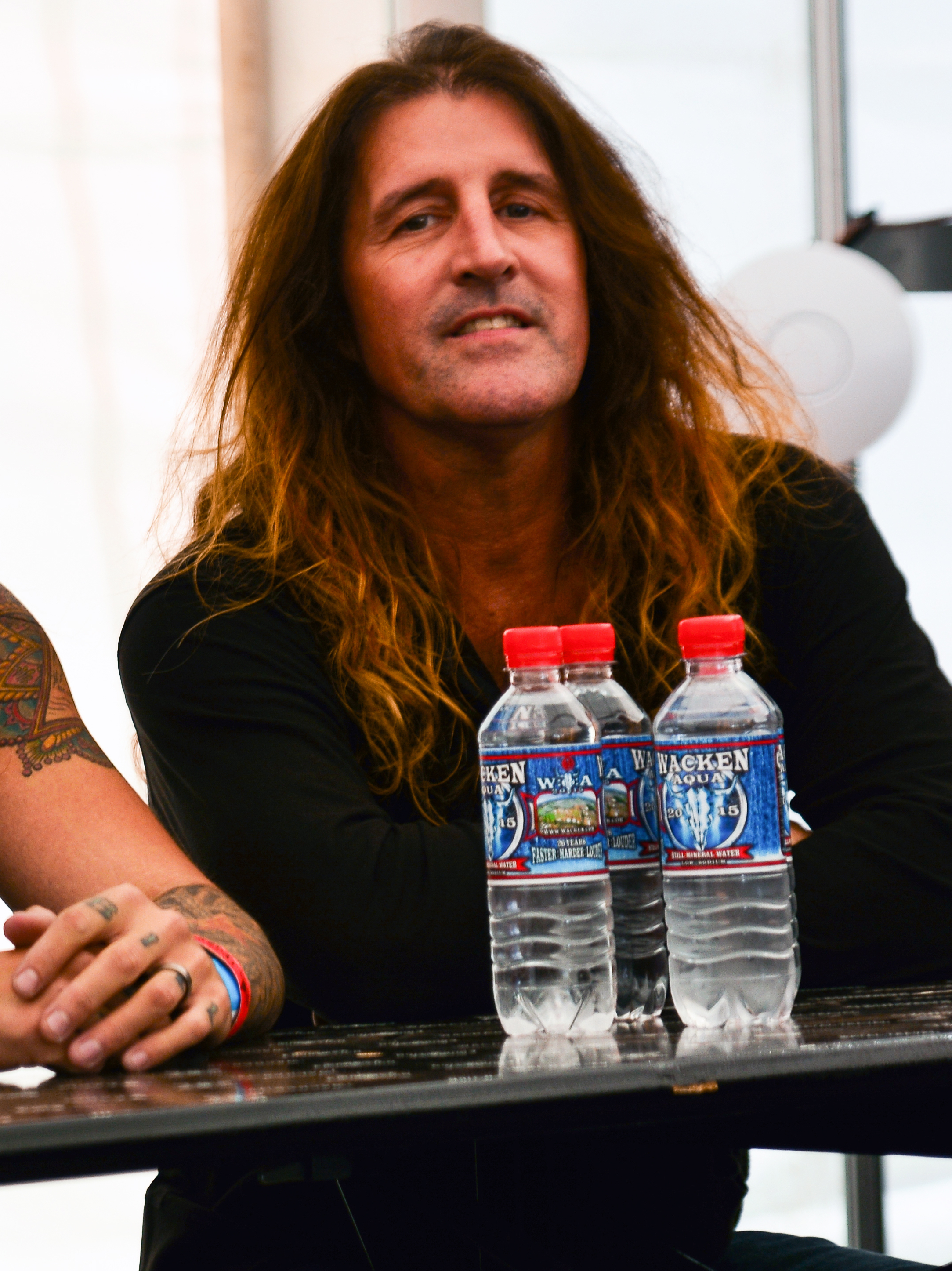
Plate with Savatage in 2015

After hearing of the death of Criss Oliva, guitarist and founding member of Savatage, Jeff called Zak Stevens to see how he was doing, and was surprised to learn that Savatage was committed to regroup and continue. Replacing drummer Andy James, he joined the band for the Handful Of Rain U.S tour in the fall of '94. Plate recorded three more albums with Savatage: Dead Winter Dead, The Wake Of Magellan, and Poets and Madmen. He played again with the band at Wacken Open Air 2015, their first show since 2002 and continues to be a member.

The success of the single "Christmas Eve/Sarajevo 12/24" from Dead Winter Dead lead to the formation of the Trans-Siberian Orchestra (TSO). Plate has performed on every TSO release to date, including Christmas Eve and Other Stories, The Christmas Attic, and Night Castle. He has performed on every Trans-Siberian Orchestra Tour, including the annual Winter Tours and several Spring Tours.

In addition to his work with TSO, Plate has performed on the solo albums of fellow TSO and Savatage member Chris Caffery, as well as shows with former Trans-Siberian Orchestra violinist Mark Wood and his Electrify Your Strings Program. In 2006 Plate recorded "Long Time No Sing" with vocalist John West.

Plate joined American heavy metal band Metal Church in 2006. During his 11-year tenure with Metal Church, he recorded four albums and did several world tours with them. After some member changes and a brief hiatus, they reformed in 2012 and released two more albums (Generation Nothing and XI) before Plate left the band in March 2017.

In 2009, Jeff would team up once more with former Savatage bandmate Zak Stevens and former Wicked Witch bandmate Matt Leff to relaunch Wicked Witch under a new moniker, Machines of Grace. They recruited bassist Chris Rapoza, re-worked and re-recorded the original Wicked Witch material and ultimately released a self-titled album.

In 2020, Jeff Plate announced the formation of a new project he was starting called 'Alta Reign'. The group released their debut record in early 2021 to much success and plenty of positive reviews, The group is currently in the midst of recording their second album, due for release sometime in 2022.

== Discography ==
=== Savatage ===
- Japan Live '94 (1995)
- Dead Winter Dead (1995)
- The Wake of Magellan (1997)
- Poets and Madmen (2001)

=== Trans Siberian Orchestra ===
- Christmas Eve and Other Stories (1996)
- The Christmas Attic (1998)
- Beethoven's Last Night (2000)
- The Lost Christmas Eve (2004)
- Night Castle (2009)
- Dreams of Fireflies (on A Christmas Night) (2013)
- Letters from the Labyrinth (2015)

=== Chris Caffery ===
- Faces/The Damn War (2004)
- Music Man (2004)
- W.A.R.P.E.D. (2005)

=== Doctor Butcher ===
- re-release of "Inspector Highway" (2005)

=== Metal Church ===
- A Light in the Dark (2006)
- This Present Wasteland (2008)
- Generation Nothing (2013)
- XI (2016)

=== John West ===
- Long Time No Sing (2006)

=== Machines of Grace ===
- Machines of Grace (2009)
