= Faces (Chris Caffery album) =

Studio album by Chris Caffery
- Released: September 24, 2004
- Recorded: Spin Studios, Long Island City, Queens, New York
- Genre: Progressive metal, heavy metal
- Length: 128:47
- Label: Black Lotus
- Producer: Chris Caffery, Nik Chinboukas

Chris Caffery chronology
Faces (2004)	W.A.R.P.E.D. (2005)

Professional ratings
Review scores
Source	Rating
Allmusic	3.5/5 stars

Faces is the debut solo album released by Savatage guitarist Chris Caffery in 2004. The album was released in a double CD edition, but other editions exist, including a one disc, two disc digipak, and two disc digipak with bonus tracks.

== Track listing ==
All songs by Chris Caffery, except where indicated

CD one

1. "Alas" - 1:33
2. "Faces" - 4:36
3. "Fade into the X" - 5:13
4. "Pisses Me Off" - 5:24
5. "Remember" - 4:42
6. "Fall" - 4:03
7. "Music Man" - 4:52
8. "Life Crazy Life" - 4:31
9. "Mold" - 5:03
10. "Bag o'Bones" (Caffery, Steve Broderick) - 3:31
11. "Evil Is as Evil Does" - 3:19
12. "Never" - 6:43
13. "So Far Today" - 4:48
14. "Jealousy" - 6:05
15. "Preludio" - 4:56
16. "Abandoned" - 6:50

CD two - The Damn War

1. "God Damn War" - 6:33
2. "Fool, Fool!" - 2:56
3. "Edge of Darkness" - 4:10
4. "Saddamize" - 7:37
5. "I" - 4:33
6. "W.A.R.P.E.D." - 3:34
7. "Fright Knights" - 6:37
8. "Amazing Grace" - 1:36
9. "Piece Be with You" - 5:53
10. "Beat Me, You'll Never Beat Me" (Caffery, Jon Oliva) - 5:59
11. "Curtains" - 3:13

== Credits ==
- Chris Caffery - lead and backing vocals, all instruments, producer, engineer, mixing
- Paul Morris - keyboards, piano
- Dave Z - bass guitar
- Jeff Plate - drums, percussion
- Dave Eggar - cello
- George Kokonas - lute, backing vocals
- Nik Chinboukas - keyboards, backing vocals, producer, engineer, mixing
- Pete Benjamin - engineer
- Seth Siro Anton – artwork
