= Doctor Butcher =

Studio album by Doctor Butcher
- Released: December 1994
- Recorded: August–October 1994
- Studios: Morrisound Studios, Tampa, Florida
- Genres: Progressive metal, power metal
- Length: 50:00
- Labels: GUN (Germany); Zero Corporation (Japan)
- Producers: Jon Oliva, Chris Caffery, Jim Morris,

Alternative cover
- Black Lotus Records remastered album cover

Professional ratings
Review scores
| Source | Rating |
|---|---|
| AllMusic | 4.5/5 stars |
| Collector's Guide to Heavy Metal | 10/10 |
| Metal Hammer (GER) | 7/7 |
| Metal Storm | 8.5/10 |
| Rock Hard | 10/10 |

Doctor Butcher was a side project involving Jon Oliva and Chris Caffery of Savatage which released one major self-titled studio album in 1994. The original album title, A Living Hell, was changed at the last minute.

The project was born when Oliva left Savatage at the conclusion of their 1991 tour in support of their album Streets: A Rock Opera. Caffery was invited to play with the band on tour, like he did in the support of their 1989 album Gutter Ballet, but this was not possible because of issues within Atlantic Records. After Caffery heard of Oliva's departure from the fore of the band, he called him, and "over ten bottles of Jack Daniels", Doctor Butcher was born.

Zachary Stevens replaced Oliva as lead vocalist for Savatage in 1993, but Jon continued to work with his brother Criss on the record which would eventually become Edge of Thorns. Caffery was again asked to re-join the band, but he stayed loyal to Jon and Doctor Butcher. Some initial demos were recorded with Hal Patino and Gene Barnett, but bad press over Oliva's health (he was still recovering from the drug and alcohol addiction he had during the late 80s and early 90s) lead Atlantic Records to make a decision between Doctor Butcher or Savatage and the label chose the latter.

Hopes of an American release were shattered. However, Doctor Butcher was picked up for a European release, and a self-titled album followed. Despite being let down by a non-US release, plans were made for a second record with the tentative title, The Good, The Bad, and the Butchered, to be released in January 1996. However, after Oliva and Caffery re-joined Savatage, the album saw a possible release date pushed to 1997 (a post on the Savatage website claimed that it may also have been released prior to the band's then forthcoming album, The Wake of Magellan). Due to a contractual obligation to Edel Records, the second album was eventually never released.

A compilation of the band's demos was released in 1999 by Crook Records. In 2005, Black Lotus Records re-issued the album with a bonus disc, featuring one new song ("Inspecter Highway") and four tracks taken from the demo CD.

== Track listing ==
All tracks are written by Chris Caffery and Jon Oliva.

| No. | Title | Length |
|---|---|---|
| 1. | "The Altar" | 5:39 |
| 2. | "Don't Talk to Me" | 3:02 |
| 3. | "Season of the Witch" | 6:19 |
| 4. | "Reach Out and Torment Someone" | 2:28 |
| 5. | "Juice" | 1:43 |
| 6. | "The Chair" | 6:13 |
| 7. | "Innocent Victim" | 5:20 |
| 8. | "The Picture's Wild" | 4:45 |
| 9. | "Lost in the Dark" | 4:52 |
| 10. | "I Hate, You Hate, We All Hate!!!" | 4:34 |
| 11. | "All for One... None for All" | 4:41 |

Reissue bonus CD
| No. | Title | Length |
|---|---|---|
| 1. | "Inspecter Highway" (recorded and mixed at Spin Studios, Astoria, New York, February 2005) | 8:13 |
| 2. | "Freaks" (demo, October 1992) | 4:49 |
| 3. | "Born of the Board" (demo, October 1992) | 7:32 |
| 4. | "Help! Police?" (demo, October 1992) | 6:33 |
| 5. | "Bridges" (demo, October 1992) | 5:30 |

== Personnel ==
- Jon Oliva – lead vocals, bass guitars, keyboards, producer
- Christopher Caffery – lead, rhythm and bass guitars, producer, mixing
- Johnny Osborn – drums, percussion

Additional musicians

- Hal Patino – bass guitar on tracks 2–5 of bonus CD
- Gene Barnett – drums on tracks 2–5 of bonus CD
- "Metal" Mike Chlasciak – guitar solo on "Inspecter Highway"
- David Z – bass guitar on "Inspecter Highway"
- Jeff Plate – drums on "Inspecter Highway"
- Paul Morris – piano on "Inspecter Highway"
- Dave Eggar – strings on "Inspecter Highway"

Production

- Jim Morris – co–producer, engineer, mixing
- Tom Morris – engineer, mixing
- Steve Heritage, Mark Prator, Jeff MacDonald – assistant engineers
- John Goldwater – executive producer
- Nik Chinboukas – producer and engineer on "Inspecter Highway"
