= A Knight in York =

Live album by Blackmore's Night
- Released: June 29, 2012 (Germany); July 2, 2012 (UK); October 9, 2012 (United States)
- Recorded: September 30, 2011
- Genre: Folk rock, neo-medieval
- Length: 79:39
- Label: Ariola, UDR
- Producer: Ritchie Blackmore

Blackmore's Night chronology
Autumn Sky (2010)	A Knight in York (2012)	Dancer and the Moon (2013)

A Knight in York is a live album by the group Blackmore's Night, released in 2012. The album recorded in autumn of 2011 at the Opera House in York, England. It entered at #2 on the New Age Billboard Charts. It entered at #2 on the German DVD Charts, and entered at 8# on the German album charts. The album also reached #46 in Austria and #85 in Switzerland. It mostly consists of songs from their two albums, Secret Voyage and Autumn Sky.

== Track listing ==
1. "Locked Within the Crystal Ball" – 8:47
2. "Gilded Cage" - 4:18
3. "The Circle" - 7:17
4. "Journeyman" - 6:58 (Nordman cover)
5. "World of Stone" - 6:14
6. "The Peasant's Promise" - 5:11
7. "Toast to Tomorrow" - 4:48
8. "Fires at Midnight" - 9:44
9. "Barbara Allen" - 5:27
10. "Darkness" - 3:30
11. "Dance of the Darkness" - 3:47
12. "Dandelion Wine" - 6:07
13. "All the Fun of the Fayre" - 4:07
14. "First of May" - 3:35 (Bee Gees cover)

== Personnel ==
- Ritchie Blackmore - guitars, mandolin, hurdy-gurdy
- Candice Night - lead vocals, shawms, assorted woodwinds, tambourine
- Squire Malcolm of Lumley (Malcolm Dick) - drums, percussion
- Bard David of Larchmont - keyboards, background vocals
- Gypsy Rose (Elizabath Cary) - violins, background vocals
- Earl Grey of Chimay (Mike Clemente) - bass, rhythm guitar
- Minstrel Albert - shawms, bagpipes
- Autumn - special guest

== Charts ==
Chart (2012)	Peak position
Austrian Albums (Ö3 Austria)	46
German Albums (Offizielle Top 100)	8
Hungarian Albums (MAHASZ)	36
Russian Albums Chart	24
Swiss Albums (Schweizer Hitparade)	85
US Top New Age Charts (Billboard)	2
