= Demons of Insanity – Chapter Five =

Studio album by Metalium
- Released: 25 April 2005
- Recorded: December 2004-February 2005
- Studio: Blue Noise Studios and Tornado Studios, Hamburg, Germany; Jumpower Studio, Mallorca
- Genre: Power metal, heavy metal
- Length: 66:16
- Label: Armageddon Music
- Producer: Lars Ratz, Matthias Lange, Michael Ehré

Metalium chronology
As One – Chapter Four (2004)	Demons of Insanity – Chapter Five (2005)	Nothing to Undo – Chapter Six (2007)

Professional ratings
Review scores
Source	Rating
Allmusic	3.5/5 stars
Darkscene.at	5.5/10

Demons of Insanity – Chapter Five is the fifth studio album by the German power metal band Metalium, released in 2005.

== Track listing ==
1. "Earth in Pain" (Lars Ratz, Michael Ehré) - 1:08
2. "Power of Time" (Ratz) - 4:13
3. "Demons of Insanity" (Matthias Lange, Ratz) - 4:29
4. "Cyber Horizon" (Ehré) - 5:24
5. "Ride On" (Ehré) - 6:02
6. "Endless Believer" (Ratz) - 8:06
7. "Sky Is Falling" (Ratz) - 4:28
8. "Destiny" (Ehré) - 4:47
9. "Mother Earth" (Henning Basse, Ratz) - 4:12
10. "Out of the Silence" (Ratz) - 4:32
11. "Atrocity" (Ratz) - 3:38
12. "Silence of the Night" (Ratz) - 6:02
13. "Visions of Paradise" (Ehré) - 4:02
14. "One by One" (Ehré) - 5:10
15. "Heavy Metal Crazy Night" - 4:06 (Japan bonus track)

== Personnel ==
Band members

- Henning Basse - lead and backing vocals
- Matthias Lange - guitars, backing vocals, co-producer, engineer
- Lars Ratz - bass, guitar, backing vocals, producer, engineer, mixing, mastering
- Michael Ehré - drums, guitar, backing vocals, co-producer

Additional musicians

- Don Airey – keyboards, Moog synthesizer
- Victor Bullock – guitar solo on track 10, engineer, editing, mixing
- Markus Deml – guitar solo on tracks 7, 8, 9
- Stefan Schlabritz - voice of the Metal God
- Fred H. Ranzenberger - tenor

Production

- Christian Jungebluth – engineer, editing, mastering, drum engineering
- Florian Sommer – mixing
- Ralph Kessler – mastering
- Frans Mensink – cover art
- Friedrun Reinhold (German) – photography
- Kai Swillus – graphic design, booklet
