= W.A.R.P.E.D. =

Studio album by Chris Caffery
- Released: 13 June 2005
- Recorded: Spin Studios, Long Island City, Queens, New York
- Genres: Progressive metal, heavy metal, groove metal
- Length: 72:27
- Label: Black Lotus
- Producers: Chris Caffery, Nik Chinboukas

Chris Caffery chronology
Faces (2005)	W.A.R.P.E.D. (2005)	Pins and Needles (2007)

Professional ratings
Review scores
Source	Rating
Allmusic	2/5 stars

W.A.R.P.E.D. is a 2005 album by Savatage guitarist Chris Caffery. It is a concept album with every song dedicated to a facet of war. The majority of the songs already appeared on the second disc of the US edition of Caffery's first album, Faces.

== Track listing ==
1. "Home Is Where the Hell Is" - 7:02
2. "God Damn War" - 6:34
3. "Election Day" - 2:34
4. "Erase" - 5:40
5. "Fool, Fool!" - 2:57
6. "Edge of Darkness" - 4:10
7. "Saddamize" - 7:38
8. "'I'" - 4:32
9. "Iraq Attack" - 5:25
10. "W.A.R.P.E.D." - 3:37
11. "State of the Head" - 5:35
12. "Amazing Grace" - 1:36
13. "Piece Be with You" - 5:54
14. "Beat Me, You'll Never Beat Me" - 6:00
15. "Curtains" - 3:13

== Credits ==
- Chris Caffery - lead and backing vocals, all instruments, producer, engineer, mixing
- Paul Morris - keyboards, piano
- Dave Z - bass guitar
- Jeff Plate - drums, percussion
- Dave Eggar - cello
- George Kokonas - lute, backing vocals
- Jon Oliva - lead vocals on "Iraq Attack"
- Brian Gregory - bass guitar on "Iraq Attack"
- Nik Chinboukas - percussion, backing vocals, producer, engineer, mixing
- Pete Benjamin - engineer
- Seth Siro Anton – artwork
