= Raise the Curtain =

Studio album by Jon Oliva
- Released: June 21, 2013
- Recorded: 2012
- Genres: Progressive rock, heavy metal
- Length: 56:42
- Label: AFM Records
- Producer: Jon Oliva

Professional ratings
Review scores
| Source | Rating |
|---|---|
| Jukebox:Metal | 5/5 stars |

Raise the Curtain is the debut solo release by American musician Jon Oliva. It was released in June 2013.

== Track listing ==
| No. | Title | Length |
|---|---|---|
| 1. | "Raise the Curtain" | 5:12 |
| 2. | "Soul Chaser" | 4:09 |
| 3. | "Ten Years" | 3:38 |
| 4. | "Father Time" | 4:32 |
| 5. | "I Know" | 6:29 |
| 6. | "Big Brother" | 4:12 |
| 7. | "Armageddon" | 4:45 |
| 8. | "Soldier" | 4:53 |
| 9. | "Stalker" | 4:42 |
| 10. | "The Witch" | 4:37 |
| 11. | "Can't Get Away" | 6:49 |

Limited edition bonus track
| No. | Title | Length |
|---|---|---|
| 12. | "The Truth" | 2:50 |

== Personnel ==
- Jon Oliva – lead vocals, piano, guitars, keyboards, drums, bass
- Christopher Kinder – drums, percussion, backing vocals
- Dan Fasciano – piano, keyboards
- Howard Helm – keyboards
- Jim Morris, Laurian Mohai, Dana Piper, Dave Kaminsky – guitars
- Jon Tucker – saxophone
- Jordan Craig, Derek Blankenship, Riley Sulick – horns
