= Grounded – Chapter Eight =

Studio album by Metalium
- Released: 25 September 2009
- Recorded: March–June 2009
- Studio: Rusa Casa Studio and Tornado Studios, Majorca, Spain
- Genre: Heavy metal, power metal
- Length: 47:50
- Label: Massacre
- Producer: Lars Ratz

Metalium chronology
Incubus - Chapter Seven (2008)	Grounded – Chapter Eight (2009)

Professional ratings
Review scores
Source	Rating
Darkscene.at	5/10
Powermetal.de	6/10

Grounded – Chapter Eight is the eighth studio album by the German power metal band Metalium, released on 25 September 2009. The song "Heavy Metal" was released as a single on 16 June 2009. It is the band's last album before their split-up from 2011 to 2023, and their final one with founding bassist Lars Ratz who died in an ultralight crash in 2021.

== Track listing ==
1. "Heavy Metal" (Lars Ratz, Tolo Grimalt) - 3:33
2. "Light of Day" (Michael Ehré) - 4:08
3. "Pay for Fee" (Ratz, Grimalt) - 4:22
4. "Pharaoh's Slavery" (Ratz, Grimalt) - 6:15
5. "Crossroad Overload" (Ehré) - 4:57
6. "Falling into Darkness" (Ratz, Grimalt) - 4:50
7. "Alone" (Ratz, Grimalt) - 4:01
8. "Borrowed Time" (Ehré) - 6:09
9. "Once Loyal" (Ehré) - 3:46
10. "Lonely" (Ehré) - 5:48
11. "Can't Tell The Future" (Japanese bonus track)

== Personnel ==
Band members

- Henning Basse - lead and backing vocals
- Matthias Lange - guitars
- Tolo Grimalt - guitars
- Lars Ratz - bass, keyboards, additional guitars, producer
- Michael Ehré - drums, keyboards, additional guitars
