= Incubus – Chapter Seven =

Incubus - Chapter Seven

Studio album by Metalium
- Released: 22 February 2008
- Recorded: September 2007
- Studio: Tornado Studios, Mallorca, Spain
- Genre: Heavy metal, power metal
- Length: 46:16
- Label: Massacre
- Producer: Lars Ratz

Metalium chronology
Nothing to Undo – Chapter Six (2007)	Incubus - Chapter Seven (2008)	Grounded – Chapter Eight (2009)

Professional ratings
Review scores
Source	Rating
Darkscene.at	6.5/10
Metal1.info	8.5/10
Metalfan.nl	80/100

Incubus - Chapter Seven is the seventh studio album by the German power metal band Metalium, released in February 2008 via Massacre Records.

== Track listing ==
1. "Trust" (intro) - 2:21
2. "Resurrection" - 4:33
3. "Gates" - 4:15
4. "Incubus" - 6:57
5. "Take Me Higher" - 4:31
6. "Never Die" - 4:54
7. "At Armageddon" - 4:52
8. "Sanity" - 4:33
9. "Meet Your Maker" - 4:43
10. "Hellfire" - 4:37
11. "Soulchaser" - 6:05 (Japanese edition bonus track)

== Personnel ==
Band members

- Henning Basse - vocals
- Matthias Lange - guitars
- Tolo Grimalt - guitars
- Lars Ratz - bass, keyboards, additional guitars (track 1), backing vocals (tracks 2 and 8)
- Michael Ehré - drums, keyboards, additional guitars (tracks 1, 5, 6, 9, and 10)

Additional vocalists

- Didi Schulz
- Jay Bunnings
- Kay Karstens
- Stefan Schlabritz
