= Maniacal Renderings =

Studio album by Jon Oliva's Pain
- Released: September 1, 2006
- Recorded: 2005
- Genre: Heavy metal
- Length: 57:47
- Label: AFM Records
- Producers: Jon Oliva, Greg Marchak, Christopher Kinder

Jon Oliva's Pain chronology
Straight Jacket Memoirs (2006)	Maniacal Renderings (2006)	Global Warning (2008)

Maniacal Renderings is a 2006 release by Jon Oliva's Pain. It was their first full-length studio recording released for new label AFM Records.

The album features material and riffs recorded by Jon Oliva's late brother, Criss. Jon said that he moves around a lot and his wife found a box of old cassette tapes inside a shoebox, with Criss's handwriting on it. Jon said that during their days in Savatage, the two would write, practice and record music, then swap so they could finish each other's songs. He stated that there is plenty of material from the box that could be used in future works.

The album was rated 3.5 out of 5 stars by AllMusic.

== Track listing ==
No.	Title	Writer(s)	Length
1.	"Through the Eyes of the King"	Jon Oliva, John Zahner, Matt LaPorte, Kevin Rothney, Christopher Kinder	4:35
2.	"Maniacal Renderings"	Jon Oliva, Criss Oliva, John Zahner, Matt LaPorte	7:44
3.	"The Evil Beside You"	Jon Oliva, Criss Oliva, John Zahner, Kevin Rothney	4:50
4.	"Time to Die"	Jon Oliva, Criss Oliva, Matt LaPorte	4:25
5.	"The Answer"	Jon Oliva	5:37
6.	"Push It to the Limit"	Jon Oliva, Kevin Rothney	3:01
7.	"Who's Playing God"	Jon Oliva	4:16
8.	"Timeless Flight"	Jon Oliva, Criss Oliva, Matt LaPorte	6:53
9.	"Holes"	Jon Oliva	5:10
10.	"End Times"	Jon Oliva	7:50
11.	"Still I Pray for You Now"	Jon Oliva	3:17

Tincase bonus track
No.	Title	Writer(s)	Length
12.	"Only You / Pyramids & Mars (hidden track)"	Jon Oliva	10:43

Digipak bonus track
No.	Title	Writer(s)	Length
12.	"Reality's Fool / Pyramids & Mars (hidden track)"	Jon Oliva	11:06

== Personnel ==
- Jon Oliva – lead vocals, keyboards
- Matt LaPorte – guitars
- Shane French – guitars
- Kevin Rothney – bass
- John Zahner – keyboards
- Christopher Kinder – drums

=== Additional musicians ===
- Tony Oliva – 12-string guitar on "Still I Pray for You Now"
- Anthony Oliva – bass on "Still I Pray for You Now"
- Christopher J. Oliva – acoustic guitar on "Still I Pray for You Now", lead guitar on "Reality's Fool"
- Adnan Al Hamdan – lead guitar on "Reality's Fool"

=== Further credits ===
- Produced by Jon Oliva, Greg Marchak and Christopher Kinder
- Recorded by Greg Marchak at Audio Lab Studios in Tampa, Florida
- Mixed by Greg Marchak and Jim Morris at Morrisound Studios in Tampa, Florida; assisted by Jason Blackerby
- Engineered by Tom Morris, Christopher Kinder and Jason Blackerby
- Mastered by Greg Marchak and Kim Faulkenberry at Audio Lab Studios in Tampa, Florida
- Digital editing by Wes Price at Polysound
- Front and back cover artwork by Thomas Ewerhard
- Cover photography by Steffi Veenstra
- Booklet design by Kathy Tijou; assisted by Leia Tijou
