= Hero Nation – Chapter Three =

Hero Nation - Chapter Three

Studio album by Metalium
- Released: 25 February 2002
- Recorded: November–December 2001
- Studio: Tornado Studio, Hamburg, Germany
- Genre: Power metal, speed metal
- Length: 57:45
- Label: Massacre
- Producer: Lars Ratz

Metalium chronology
State of Triumph – Chapter Two (2000)	Hero Nation - Chapter Three (2002)	As One – Chapter Four (2004)

Hero Nation – Chapter Three is the third studio album recorded by the German power metal band Metalium and released on 25 February 2002. It is their first album with drummer Michael Ehré.

== Track listing ==
All songs by Metalium

1. "Source of Souls" - 1:13
2. "Revenge of Tizona" - 3:45
3. "In the Name of Blood" - 4:24
4. "Rasputin" - 5:34
5. "Odin's Spell" - 6:26
6. "Accused to Be a Witch" - 4:45
7. "Throne in the Sky" - 3:29
8. "Odyssey" - 4:35
9. "Fate Conquered the Power" - 5:28
10. "Infinite Love" - 5:42
11. "Hero Nation / Heart of the Tiger" - 12:26

"Hero Nation" ends at 5:01, followed by two minutes of silence before "Heart of the Tiger".

== Personnel ==
Band members

- Henning Basse - vocals
- Matthias Lange - guitars
- Lars Ratz - bass, producer, mixing
- Michael Ehré - drums

Additional musicians

- Don Airey - keyboards on tracks 1, 3, 5, 6
- Ken Hensley - Hammond organ on track 9
- Tom Naumann - guitar solos on track 9
- Stefan Schlahritz - vocals on tracks 1, 3, 4
- Carolin Fortenbacher - vocals on tracks 1, 3, 10

Production

- Eduardo Garcia - mixing
