= State of Triumph – Chapter Two =

State of Triumph - Chapter Two

Studio album by Metalium
- Released: 26 June 2000
- Recorded: January–May 2000
- Studio: Impulse Recording Stusios, Hamburg, Germany
- Genre: Heavy metal, power metal
- Length: 54:50
- Label: Massacre
- Producer: Lars Ratz, JP Genkel

Metalium chronology
Millennium Metal – Chapter One (1999)	State of Triumph - Chapter Two (2000)	Hero Nation – Chapter Three (2002)

Professional ratings
Review scores
Source	Rating
Chronicles of Chaos	3/10

State of Triumph – Chapter Two is the second album recorded by the German power metal band Metalium. It was released in 2000, following their first release, Millennium Metal - Chapter One and continues the story which began in the first album.

== Track listing ==
All songs by Lange and Ratz, except "Music" by John Miles and "Dust in the Wind" by Kerry Livgren.

1. "Elements" - 1:42
2. "Steel Avenger" - 3:21
3. "Years of Darion" - 5:06
4. "Break Out" - 4:11
5. "Erania" - 4:27
6. "Stygian Flames" - 4:16
7. "Prophecy" - 7:55
8. "Eye of the Storm" - 4:24
9. "Inner Sight" - 5:54
10. "State of Triumph" - 7:40
11. "Music" (John Miles cover) - 5:55
12. "Dust in the Wind" (Kansas cover) (Japanese edition bonus track)

== Personnel ==
Band members

- Henning Basse - vocals
- Matthias Lange - guitars
- Jack Frost - guitars
- Lars Ratz - bass, producer, mixing
- Mark Cross - drums

Additional musicians

- Paul Morris - keyboards and orchestration
- Jutta Weinhold, Jacqueline Wenk, Simone Barthel, Uta Delbridge - backing vocals

Production

- JP Genkel - co-producer, engineer, mixing
