= Nothing to Undo – Chapter Six =

Studio album by Metalium
- Released: 20 February 2007
- Recorded: September 2006
- Genre: Power metal
- Length: 43:45
- Label: Massacre
- Producer: Lars Ratz

Metalium chronology
Demons of Insanity – Chapter Five (2005)	Nothing to Undo – Chapter Six (2007)	Incubus – Chapter Seven (2008)

Professional ratings
Review scores
Source	Rating
Allmusic	3.5/5 stars
Darkscene.at	6/10
Metal1.info	7.5/10

Nothing to Undo – Chapter Six is the sixth studio album by the German power metal band Metalium, released on 20 February 2007.

== Track listing ==
1. "Spineless Scum" - 1:12
2. "Spirits" - 3:45
3. "Mindless" - 4:54
4. "Straight into Hell" - 3:44
5. "Mental Blindness" - 6:54
6. "Heroes Failed" - 3:44
7. "Way Home" - 6:41
8. "Dare" - 3:44
9. "Follow the Sign" - 4:58
10. "The Show Must Go On" - 4:20 (Queen cover)
11. "Way Home" (Orchestral version) - 6:41 (Japanese edition bonus track)

== Personnel ==
Band members

- Henning Basse - lead and backing vocals
- Matthias Lange - guitars, backing vocals
- Lars Ratz - bass, backing vocals, producer
- Michael Ehré - drums, backing vocals

Additional musicians

- Andreas Noether - acoustic guitars
- Frank Rohles - guitars
- Patrick Felsner - piano
- Didi Schulz, Jay Bunnings, Kay Karstens, Stefan Schlabritz - additional vocals
