= As One – Chapter Four =

As One - Chapter Four

Studio album by Metalium
- Released: 29 March 2004
- Recorded: 2003
- Genre: Power metal
- Length: 55:10
- Label: Armageddon Music

Metalium chronology
Hero Nation – Chapter Three (2002)	As One - Chapter Four (2004)	Demons of Insanity – Chapter Five (2005)

Professional ratings
Review scores
Source	Rating
Chronicles of Chaos	5/10

As One – Chapter Four is the fourth studio album by the German power metal band Metalium, released in 29 March 2004, after a delay from the "final editing of the included video." Keyboards were handled by Don Airey, known for his work with rock and metal acts like Ozzy Osbourne, Black Sabbath, Rainbow, and Whitesnake. It is their first album with drummer Michael Ehré.

== Track listing ==
1. "Astral Avatar" - 1:30
2. "Warrior" - 3:56
3. "Pain Crawls in the Night" - 4:27
4. "Find Out" - 6:29
5. "No One Will Save You" - 4:46
6. "Meaning of Light" - 1:22
7. "Illuminated" - 9:45
8. "Meaning of Light (Reprise)" - 1:04
9. "Athena" - 4:46
10. "Power Strikes the Earth" - 5:44
11. "Goddess of Love and Pain" - 5:19
12. "As One" - 6:00
13. "Screaming in the Darkness" - 5:44 (European bonus track)
14. "Don't Tell No Lies" - 5:36 (Japanese bonus track)

"As One" ends at 4:00, followed by a minute of silence before a minute of spoken narration.

== Personnel ==
Band members

- Henning Basse - vocals
- Matthias Lange - guitars
- Lars Ratz - bass
- Michael Ehré - drums

Session members

- Don Airey - keyboards
- Saeko Kitamae - vocals as Metaliana
