= Global Warning (Jon Oliva's Pain album) =

Studio album by Jon Oliva's Pain
- Released: March 21, 2008 (Europe); April 30, 2008 (North America)
- Recorded: 2007
- Genre: Heavy metal
- Length: 59:50 (standard edition); 65:52 (limited edition)
- Labels: AFM, Locomotive
- Producers: Jon Oliva, Christopher Kinder

Jon Oliva's Pain chronology
Maniacal Renderings (2006)	Global Warning (2008)	Festival (2010)

Global Warning is a 2008 release by Jon Oliva's Pain. It is the band's third studio release. The record reached number 11 in the German MRC Rock Radio Charts during March 2008.

On February 7, 2008, the initial track list of the album was posted at the band's forums. On February 8, five song samples from said track list were posted on the band's MySpace page. In support of the album, the band announced a tour of the United States and Europe, with support on the European dates coming from Manticora and Masterstroke. The US tour was scheduled with support from Circle II Circle and Manticora. The tour with both JOP and CIIC would mean that Jon Oliva and Zachary Stevens were on the same bill for the first time since Savatage's 1999 tour.

The record features a guest appearance by Ralph Santolla on two tracks: "Adding the Cost" and "You Never Know". The track "Before I Hang" is made up of two previous Savatage songs—the original "Before I Hang" (of which a demo was released on The Dungeons Are Calling Silver Edition in 2002) as well as Streets lost track "Larry Elbows". The album also features a tribute to the band's former producer, Greg Marchak, who died prior to the album's release, entitled "O to G".

== Track listing ==
No.	Title	Writer(s)	Length
1.	"Global Warning"	Jon Oliva, Matt LaPorte, Christopher Kinder, Kevin Rothney	4:46
2.	"Look at the World"	Criss Oliva, Jon Oliva	2:54
3.	"Adding the Cost"	Jon Oliva, Matt LaPorte	3:50
4.	"Before I Hang"	Jon Oliva, Criss Oliva, Christopher Kinder	4:00
5.	"Firefly"	Criss Oliva, Jon Oliva	7:08
6.	"Master"	Jon Oliva, Matt LaPorte, Christopher Kinder, Kevin Rothney	4:00
7.	"The Ride"	Jon Oliva, Matt LaPorte, Christopher Kinder, Kevin Rothney	5:56
8.	"O to G"	Jon Oliva	1:44
9.	"Walk Upon the Water"	Jon Oliva	5:42
10.	"Stories"	Criss Oliva, Jon Oliva	4:38
11.	"Open Up Your Eyes"	Jon Oliva	4:47
12.	"You Never Know"	Jon Oliva	3:16
13.	"Someone/Souls"	Jon Oliva	7:18

Limited edition
No.	Title	Writer(s)	Length
13.	"No More Saturday Nights"	Criss Oliva, Jon Oliva	5:52

Japanese edition
No.	Title	Writer(s)	Length
13.	"I See"	Jon Oliva

== Personnel ==
- Jon Oliva – lead vocals, keyboards, guitars
- Matt LaPorte – guitars
- Kevin Rothney – bass
- John Zahner – keyboards
- Christopher Kinder – drums

Additional musicians

- Ralph Santolla – guitars (on "Adding the Cost" and "You Never Know")

=== Further credits ===
- Recorded at Morrisound Studios and Shabbey Road Studios
- Produced by Christopher Kinder and Jon Oliva
- Co-produced by Tom Morris, Matt LaPorte and Jim Morris
- Engineered by Tom Morris and Christopher Kinder
- Assistant engineer: Jason Blackerby
- Mixed by Jim Morris
- Mastered by Jim Morris and Christopher Kinder
- Spiritual and technical guidance: Greg "Super G" Marchak and Criss Oliva
- Photography by Kim Grillo
- Artwork design by Thomas Ewerhard
