= Paul Morris (musician) =

American musician (born 1959)

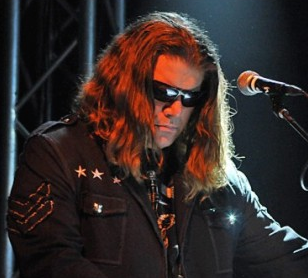
- Morris performing with Over the Rainbow in 2010.

Background information
- Born: November 2, 1959 (age 65); Santa Monica, California, U.S.
- Genres: Rock, hard rock, heavy metal, soul, jazz
- Occupation: Musician
- Instrument(s): Keyboards, piano
- Years active: 1977–present
- Website: paulmorris.nyc

Paul Morris (born November 2, 1959) is an American musician best known as a keyboardist in Ritchie Blackmore's Rainbow. He played keyboards on the Stranger in Us All album and co-wrote the song "Black Masquerade". His father was actor Robert Morris, who died under mysterious circumstances when Paul was a toddler.

== Biography ==
Paul Morris studied piano as a child in New York City. He studied under well-known jazz pianists, Lennie Tristano, Hal Galper, and Sal Mosca. He began his career playing with some local bands on Long Island named Vixen and Full House. He then played with Todd Wolfe in the band, Troy and the Tornados. Todd Wolf later became the guitarist for Sheryl Crow. In 1989 Paul got a call from rock drummer Bobby Rondinelli to play keyboards for Doro Pesch's first solo tour without Warlock for the Force Majeure album tour.

In 1990 Paul Morris played keyboards on the Doro (album) by former Warlock singer Doro Pesch. The album was produced by Gene Simmons. In 1990 he went on tour with Doro Pesch promoting the Doro (album). In 1992 Paul Morris toured with heavy metal violinist Mark Wood through the US and Canada.

In 1994, Paul Morris was notified that Ritchie Blackmore was looking for a keyboardist. He sent Ritchie Blackmore a tape, auditioned, and was hired. He played on the STRANGER IN US All and co-wrote "Black Masquerade", which then became a fan favorite. He then performed with Rainbow for two European tours, one tour in Japan, South America, and in the US. In 1997, Paul Morris toured with Nena of "99 Luftballons" fame featuring, Tony Bruno on guitar, and Tommy Price on drums. This was followed by a tour with The Teen Idols starring Davy Jones, Peter Noone and Bobby Sherman. In 2000, Morris received a call from the musical director of Trans-Siberian Orchestra, Al Pitrelli, to play with the West Coast Trans-Siberian Orchestra for the holiday season. After this tour, Morris continued his career composing and producing his own original music and doing session work. In 2002, Morris joined an 11 piece soul band called the Sensational Soul Cruisers where he remained until 2007. In 2009, Morris was approached by Joe Lynn Turner asking him to fill in for Tony Carey who had become very ill. Two weeks later Over the Rainbow performed at the Sweden Rock Festival. Morris continued touring with Over the Rainbow for the next two years.

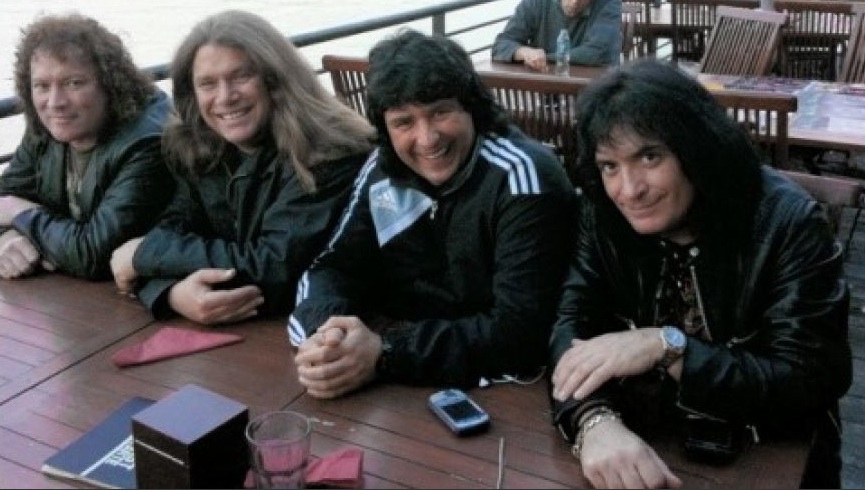
On tour with OTR

In 2011, Morris worked on a new Christmas CD by The Kings of Christmas, a new group composed primarily of former Trans-Siberian Orchestra singers and musicians. In 2017 Moogy had a short run/tour with Yngwie Malmsteen the virtuoso guitarist. Paul Morris is currently playing with one of the nation's top Bon Jovi tribute bands named Slippery When Wet as well as top 80's party band Jessie's Girl. You'll be able to catch Moogy on tour "Rock Legends Bon Fire and friends tour" this November 2018 throughout Germany. Paul will be touring with Purpendicular featuring Ian Paice Nov.5th to the 25th 2019 in Germany and France.

Late in 2019 Paul was invited to play with Deeper Purple, a Deep Purple tribute band, on their UK tour in March 2020 and Paul subsequently joined the band.

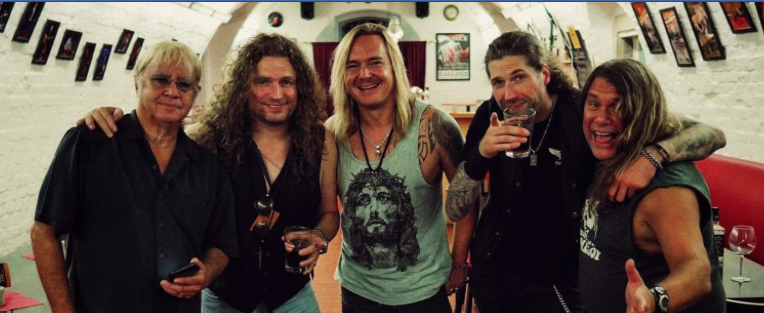

Paul Morris married Rose Grego in November 1997.

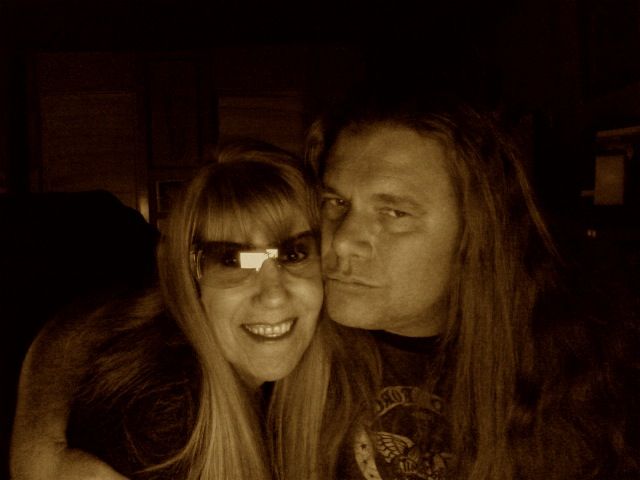
Paul & Rose

== Discography ==
=== With The Syntherchestra ===
- 1985 – The Syntherchestra

=== With Doro Pesch ===
- 1990 – Doro

=== With Ritchie Blackmore's Rainbow ===
- 1995 – Stranger in Us All

=== With Joe Lynn Turner ===
- 1998 – Hurry Up and Wait
- 1999 – Under Cover 2
- 2002 – Slam
- 2003 – JLT
- 2005 – The Usual Suspects (album)

=== With Randy Coven ===
- 1999 – Witch Way

=== With Metalium ===
- 2000 – State of Triumph: Chapter Two

=== With Trans-Siberian Orchestra ===
- 2000/2001

=== With Angus Clark ===
- 2004 – Grace Period

=== With Chris Caffery ===
- 2004 – The Mold EP
- 2004 – Music Man EP
- 2005 – Faces
- 2005 – W.A.R.P.E.D.
- 2007 – Pins and Needles

=== With The Kings of Christmas ===
- 2011 – The Kings of Christmas

=== Easy Living ===
- 2014 – Easy Living
