= Machines of Grace (album) =

Studio album by Machines of Grace
- Released: July 7, 2009
- Genre: Heavy metal, hard rock
- Length: 55:03
- Label: Self-released

Machines of Grace is the first studio album by Machines of Grace.

== Track listing ==
Machines of Grace track listing
No.	Title	Length
1.	"Just a Game"	4:59
2.	"Psychotic"	4:05
3.	"Fly Away"	3:33
4.	"Innocence"	4:21
5.	"The Moment"	4:39
6.	"Between the Lines"	4:50
7.	"This Time"	4:31
8.	"Breakdown"	4:12
9.	"Soul to Fire"	4:36
10.	"Promises"	4:55
11.	"Bleed"	4:22
12.	"Better Days"	3:54
13.	"This Time (Acoustic)"	2:56
Total length:		56:53

== Personnel ==
- Zachary Stevens – lead vocals, keyboards
- Chris Rapoza – bass
- Matt Leff – guitars
- Jeff Plate – drums
