= Millennium Metal – Chapter One =

Studio album by Metalium
- Released: 25 June 1999
- Recorded: February–March 1999
- Studios: Impulse Recording Studio, Hamburg, Germany
- Genre: Power metal
- Length: 51:05
- Label: Massacre
- Producers: Lars Ratz, Chris Caffery

Metalium chronology
Millennium Metal – Chapter One (1999)	State of Triumph – Chapter Two (2000)

Professional ratings
Review scores
Source	Rating
AllMusic	2.5/5 stars
Collector's Guide to Heavy Metal	7/10

Millennium Metal – Chapter One is the debut album by the German power metal band Metalium. It was released in 1999 by the German label Massacre Records and distributed in the USA by Pavement Music. Millennium Metal is a concept album and the first chapter of the ongoing saga of the mythic warrior Metalium. The story continues on their second album, State of Triumph - Chapter Two, released the following year.

== Track listing ==
No.	Title	Lyrics	Music	Notes	Length
1.	"Circle of Fate (Intro)"	Mike Terrana			1:47
2.	"Fight"	Lars Ratz	Ratz, Matthias Lange		3:11
3.	"Dream of Doom"	Terrana, Ratz, Lange	Lange, Ratz, Terrana		3:33
4.	"Break the Spell"	Ratz	Lange, Ratz		3:56
5.	"Revelation"	Terrana, Ratz, Lange	Chris Caffery, Lange, Ratz, Terrana		3:21
6.	"Metalium"	Terrana, Ratz, Lange	Ratz, Lange, Terrana		4:35
7.	"Metamorphosis"	Terrana, Ratz, Lange	Ratz, Lange, Terrana		5:18
8.	"Void of Fire"	Terrana, Ratz, Lange	Ratz, Lange, Terrana, Caffery		2:39
9.	"Free Forever"	Terrana, Ratz, Lange	Ratz, Lange, Terrana		4:09
10.	"Strike Down the Heathen"	Ratz	Lange, Ratz		3:44
11.	"Pilgrimage"	Terrana, Ratz, Lange	Caffery, Ratz, Lange, Terrana		5:09
12.	"Metalians"	Terrana, Ratz, Lange	Ratz, Lange, Terrana		4:08
13.	"Smoke on the Water"	Ritchie Blackmore, Ian Gillan, Roger Glover, Jon Lord, Ian Paice	Blackmore, Gillan, Glover, Lord, Paice	Deep Purple cover	5:36
14.	"Burning"	Accept	Accept	Accept cover, digipak edition bonus track	7:50

== Personnel ==
Band members

- Henning Basse - lead vocals
- Chris Caffery - guitars, co-producer
- Matthias Lange - guitars
- Lars Ratz - bass, producer, mixing
- Mike Terrana - drums, narration

Additional musicians

- Ferdy Doernberg, JP Genkel - keyboards
- Roland Grapow - guitar solo on "Metalium"
- John Osborn - drums (touring only)

Production

- JP Genkel - engineer, mixing
- Tommy Hansen - pre-mastering
- Alexander Krull - mastering
