= Over the Rainbow (band) =

American rock band formed in 2008

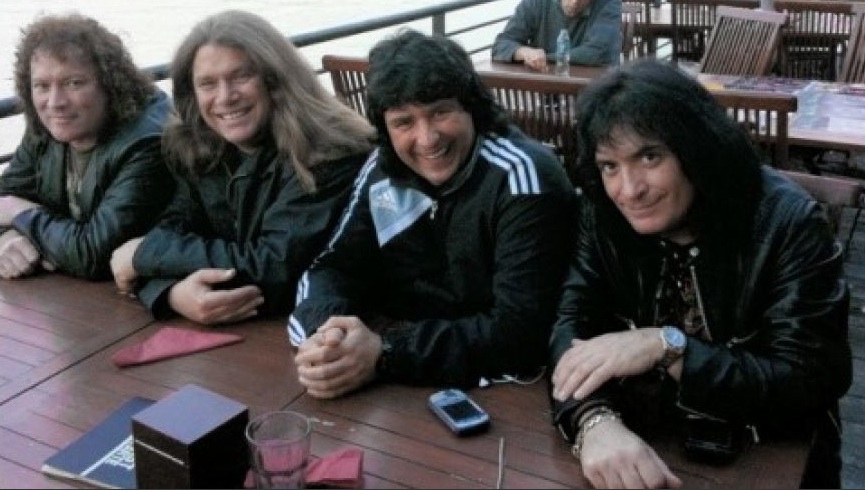
- Greg Smith, Paul Morris, Jürgen Blackmore, Bobby Rondinelli

Background information
- Origin: England
- Genres: Hard rock, heavy metal
- Years active: 2008–2011
- Past members: Jürgen Blackmore; Bobby Rondinelli; Greg Smith; Joe Lynn Turner; Tony Carey; Paul Morris

Over the Rainbow were a rock band formed in 2008 by former members of Rainbow, along with Rainbow leader Ritchie Blackmore's son Jürgen (replacing his father on guitar). Members include Joe Lynn Turner (Rainbow 1980–1984), Bobby Rondinelli (Rainbow 1980–1983), Tony Carey (Rainbow 1975–1977) and Greg Smith (Rainbow 1994–1997). There was originally at least one member in the band from every part of Rainbow's career except for the years 1979 to 1980. In late 2009, Carey was replaced by Paul Morris (Rainbow 1994–1997).

== History ==
In 2008, Carey, Rondinelli, Smith and Turner decided to work together in performing Rainbow music again but agreed that the only legitimate way that this could be accomplished was with a Blackmore on guitar. In 2009, four ex-members Joe Lynn Turner, Bobby Rondinelli, Tony Carey and Greg Smith teamed up with Jürgen Blackmore, Ritchie's son, to form Over the Rainbow. Due to ill-health Carey had to leave following the first tour and was replaced on keyboards by Paul Morris.

== Recent events ==
Over the Rainbow started a tour of Russia and Europe in late 2009, which continued until mid 2010. When asked about Over The Rainbow's plans to record a new album in an interview conducted by Neil Daniels, Bobby Rondinelli stated "Yes, in the near future." In 2011 band went to a "hiatus" so members of the band could pursue other projects according to Joe Lynn Turner's official website. Three of the five members (Morris, Smith, and Turner) toured briefly thereafter in Joe Lynn Turner's band on the east coast but not for long.

== Personnel ==
- Joe Lynn Turner – vocals (2008–2011)
- Jürgen Blackmore – guitar (2008–2011)
- Greg Smith – bass (2008–2011)
- Bobby Rondinelli – drums (2008–2011)
- Tony Carey – keyboards (2008–2009)
- Paul Morris – keyboards (2009–2011)
