= The Wake of Magellan =

Studio album by Savatage
- Released: September 15, 1997 (Europe, Japan); April 7, 1998 (US)
- Recorded: 1996–1997
- Studios: Soundtrack Studios and Studio 900 (overdubs), New York City
- Genres: Heavy metal, progressive metal
- Length: 60:06
- Labels: Concrete/Edel (Germany); JVC Victor (Japan); Lava/Atlantic (US)
- Producers: Paul O'Neill, Jon Oliva, Robert Kinkel

Savatage chronology
Dead Winter Dead (1995)	The Wake of Magellan (1997)	Poets and Madmen (2001)

The Wake of Magellan is the tenth studio album released by the American heavy metal band Savatage. The album was released in September 1997 in Europe and Japan, and in April 1998 in the US.

This is the first Savatage album to have the same lineup as the previous album since Hall of the Mountain King in 1987 and also the last to feature vocals from lead singer Zachary Stevens. The progressive metal band Dream Theater are thanked in the album's liner notes. Dream Theater keyboard player Derek Sherinian and Al Pitrelli went to college together, were both in the band Ethyl Mertz and toured with Alice Cooper for the Trashes the World tour. Pitrelli and John Petrucci also played together on a Japanese release called Guitar Battle.

== Story ==
The Wake of Magellan is a concept album based on two real life events. The first, the Maersk Dubai incident, occurred just over a year before the album was released, when the captain and officers of the ship threw three Romanian stowaways overboard in the middle of the Atlantic. A fourth stowaway was saved by the courageous actions of the ship's boatswain, Rodolfo Miguel, who risked his own life to protect the youth after witnessing the other three murders. The second event regarded the Irish reporter Veronica Guerin, who died fighting the growth of the drug trade in her country. Her death may accomplish what she could not in life. These events are combined into the story of an old Portuguese sailor, Fernão de Magalhães (Ferdinand Magellan in English), who has decided to end his life by sailing his small boat out into the Atlantic until it sinks. In his mind he has romanticized this decision as a glorious, Vikingesque way to die. When the ocean winds push him into a great storm, and he believes that his wish is about to be granted in a great dramatic fashion, he suddenly sees a man drowning in the ocean. In an instant he finds himself taking back every wish for death's embrace, and fights to save this soul. After many twists and turns, he is able to save the stowaway that had been thrown overboard. Returning to land, he now realizes that not only every life is precious but also every hour of that life.

== Reception ==
Professional ratings
Review scores
Source	Rating
AllMusic	3/5 stars
Collector's Guide to Heavy Metal	8/10
Metal1.info (GER)	9/10
Metal Hammer (GER)	7/7
Metal Rules	5/5
Rock Hard	9.5/10

Matthias Breusch of Rock Hard praised the album for being "a super-melodic, varied, one hundred percent song-oriented concentrate opus, precisely made without visible weld seam", which conquered his heart after repeated listenings. He lauded Savatage for "consistently carry through their unmistakable style and yet constantly change". Metal Rules reviewer was happy to find Jon Oliva still active as lead vocalist in two songs, but considered Zak Stevens' performance that of "a vocal genius". AllMusic Stephen Thomas Erlewine's review lingered on the ambitious narrative by Paul O'Neill and remarked how "Savatage's surprisingly graceful music not only does fit the story line, but it has sweeping melodies, intricate arrangements and stunning solos that are compelling on their own terms", showing how "the group continued to improve in the '90s". Canadian journalist Martin Popoff found The Wake of Magellan "quite thick plot-wise", but appreciated how the album got "right to the metal, a decidedly raw and basic metal oddly enough", despite the band remaining "king of piano-to-riff dynamic", more in the way of Kansas than of Queen, which Savatage had been compared to.

== Track listing ==
All lyrics are written by Paul O'Neill.

No.	Title	Music	Length
1.	"The Ocean" (instrumental)	Jon Oliva, O'Neill	1:33
2.	"Welcome"	J. Oliva, O'Neill	2:11
3.	"Turns to Me"	O'Neill, J. Oliva, Al Pitrelli	6:01
4.	"Morning Sun"	J. Oliva, O'Neill, Chris Caffery	5:49
5.	"Another Way"	O'Neill, J. Oliva, Pitrelli	4:35
6.	"Blackjack Guillotine"	J. Oliva, O'Neill, Caffery	4:33
7.	"Paragons of Innocence"	J. Oliva, O'Neill	5:33
8.	"Complaint in the System (Veronica Guerin)"	J. Oliva, O'Neill	2:37
9.	"Underture" (instrumental)	J. Oliva, O'Neill	3:52
10.	"The Wake of Magellan"	J. Oliva, O'Neill, Caffery, Johnny Lee Middleton	6:10
11.	"Anymore"	J. Oliva, O'Neill	5:16
12.	"The Storm" (instrumental)	J. Oliva, O'Neill	3:45
13.	"The Hourglass"	O'Neill, J, Oliva, Pitrelli	8:05

US edition bonus tracks
No.	Title	Writer(s)	Length
14.	"Somewhere in Time / Alone You Breathe" (acoustic version)	Criss Oliva, J. Oliva, O'Neill	4:38
15.	"Sleep" (acoustic version)	C. Oliva, J. Oliva, O'Neill	4:16
16.	"Stay" (acoustic version)	C. Oliva, J. Oliva, O'Neill	2:48
Total length:			71:42

2002 SPV CD reissue
No.	Title	Writer(s)	Length
14.	"This Is Where You Should Be"	J. Oliva	4:55
15.	"Desirée" (acoustic version)	C. Oliva, J. Oliva, O'Neill	3:53
Total length:			68:48

2010 EarMusic CD reissue
No.	Title	Writer(s)	Length
14.	"Desirée" (acoustic version)	C. Oliva, J. Oliva, O'Neill	3:54
15.	"Stay" (acoustic version)	C. Oliva, J. Oliva, O'Neill	2:48

== Personnel ==
Savatage

- Zachary Stevens – lead vocals
- Jon Oliva – keyboards, lead vocals on "Another Way" and "Paragons of Innocence", co–producer
- Chris Caffery – lead and rhythm guitars, backing vocals
- Al Pitrelli – lead and rhythm guitars, backing vocals
- Johnny Lee Middleton – bass guitar, backing vocals
- Jeff Plate – drums

Additional musicians

- Bob Kinkel – additional keyboards, additional production, engineer

Production

- Paul O'Neill – producer
- Steve Sisco – assistant engineer
- Ben Arrindell, Joe Johnson – additional engineering
- Adam Parness, Ed Osbeck, Jin Won Lee, Mike Scielzi – additional assistant engineers
- Dave Wittman – mixing
- Kevin Hodge – mastering at the Master Cutting Room, New York
- Mark Weiss – photography
- Edgar Jerins – cover art

== Charts ==
Year	Chart	Position
1997	German Albums Chart	11
1997	Japanese Albums Chart	44
1997	Dutch MegaCharts	79
1998	Billboard Heatseekers Albums (US)	26
2010	Greek Albums Chart	30

2022 chart performance for The Wake of Magellan
Chart (2022)	Peak position
Swiss Albums (Schweizer Hitparade)	99
