= Metalium =

German power metal band

- Origin: Germany
- Genres: Heavy metal, power metal
- Years active: 1998–2011, 2023-present
- Label: Massacre Records
- Members: Henning Basse; Matthias Lange; Bruno Nunes; Fabio Carito; Marcus Dotta
- Past members: Lars Ratz; Chris Caffery; Mike Terrana; Jack Frost; Mark Cross; Michael Ehré; Tolo Grimalt
- Website: Metalium Website

Metalium is a heavy metal band from Hamburg, Germany, who released eight albums during their initial run from 1998 to 2011. The band was reactivated in 2023 by founding members Henning Basse and Matthias Lange. Their style of music is that of the traditional power metal sound which was pioneered by bands such as Helloween and Blind Guardian.

== History ==
The band was formed by bassist Lars Ratz (ex-Viva, Zed Yago, Velvet Viper), vocalist Henning Basse (ex- Burgeon Street, Brainstorm) and newcomer guitarist Matthias Lange. The German musicians got acquainted with drummer Mike Terrana and Savatage guitarist Chris Caffery through Ratz's own management company during a European tour of the two Americans. The five musicians worked together on a single concept album project with a science fiction/fantasy storyline and speed metal style, to be released before the new millennium. The story is about Michael, a metal fan, who drinks a magic potion and becomes the invincible warrior Metalian. The debut Metalium album Millennium Metal – Chapter One was released in 1999 and was a success in Germany, peaking at No. 75 in the German chart and receiving positive reviews. The success of the first album ensured the continuation of the band's career, as well as new adventures for the Metalian, the main character of Metalium's ongoing saga. Jack Frost and Mark Cross replaced Caffery and Terrana respectively for the second album State of Triumph – Chapter Two, released in 2000. Both Frost and Cross had left the band by the end of 2001, leaving Lange as the only guitarist for studio recordings and introducing Michael Ehré on drums in time for Metalium's third album of 2002. Still in 2001, the band released a DVD/Video titled Metalian Attack which included a 7-track live-CD and a full Metalium concept comic book by artist Markus Mayer. In the following years the band went on tour in Europe, Russia and South America, granting its presence at many important festivals. Metalium released another six albums until 2009 and a second live DVD called Metalian Attack pt. 2 in 2006.

On 13 September 2010, the band announced on its website that it would dissolve in 2011.

On 18 April 2021, Lars Ratz died in an ultralight crash in Vilafranca de Bonany, Spain. He was 53 years old.

On August 31 2021, the surviving members of the band released a single in memory of founder Lars Ratz which also featured Grave Digger bassist Jens Becker and Deep Purple's Don Airey on keyboards. After speculation the band would be fully reactivated, Henning Basse announced that he, Matthias Lange, and new guitarist Bruno Nunes would return as Metalium in 2023. Shortly after that, the band announced that bassist Fabio Carito and drummer Marcus Dotta completed the line-up.

== Members ==
=== Current line-up ===
- Henning Basse - vocals
- Matthias Lange - guitar
- Bruno Nunes - guitar
- Fabio Carito - bass
- Marcus Dotta - drums

=== Former members ===
- Chris Caffery - guitars
- Mike Terrana - drums
- Jack Frost - guitars
- Mark Cross – drums
- Lars Ratz - bass, keyboards (died 2021)
- Michael Ehré - drums, keyboards
- Tolo Grimalt - guitar
- John Osborn – drums (live 2000 tour)
- Saeko Kitamae – vocals (live 2004 tour)
- Christian Stöver – guitars (live 2009–2010)

== Discography ==
- Millennium Metal – Chapter One (1999)
- State of Triumph – Chapter Two (2000)
- Hero Nation – Chapter Three (2002)
- As One – Chapter Four (2004)
- Demons of Insanity – Chapter Five (2005)
- Nothing to Undo – Chapter Six (2007)
- Incubus – Chapter Seven (2008)
- Grounded – Chapter Eight (2009)

== Videography ==
- Metalian Attack (2001)
- Metalian Attack pt. 2 (2006)
