= Secret Voyage =

Studio album by Blackmore's Night
- Released: 27 June 2008
- Genre: folk rock, neo-Medieval
- Length: 50:36
- Label: SPV
- Producer: Pat Regan

Blackmore's Night chronology
Paris Moon (2007)	Secret Voyage (2008)	Autumn Sky (2010)

Professional ratings
Review scores
Source	Rating
Cosmos Gaming	(favorable)
Maelstrom	5.5/10 stars

Secret Voyage is the seventh studio album by the group Blackmore's Night. According to a SPV press release, Secret Voyage is another kaleidoscopic musical journey through time and space, incorporating and rearranging traditional melodies from all over Europe, blending the "old" and contemporary. Secret Voyage consists of twelve new tracks, recorded by Candice Night, Ritchie Blackmore and their Band of Minstrels.

Secret Voyage won the New Age Reporter Lifestyle Music Award as the best Celtic album. It was also nominated for NAR awards in two more categories - Best Vocal Album and Best Cover Artwork for a CD.

== Track listing ==
No.	Title	Writer(s)	Length
1.	"God Save the Keg"	trad., Ritchie Blackmore, Pat Regan	3:40
2.	"Locked Within the Crystal Ball"	trad. (by Theme from "Stella Splendens" from "Llibre Vermell de Montserrat", 14th century), Blackmore, Candice Night	8:04
3.	"Gilded Cage"	trad., Blackmore, Night	3:42
4.	"Toast to Tomorrow"	Alexei Muravlev, Felix Dallada Blackmore, Night	3:49
5.	"Prince Waldeck's Galliard"	Blackmore	2:13
6.	"Rainbow Eyes" (Rainbow cover)	Blackmore, Ronnie James Dio	6:01
7.	"The Circle"	Blackmore, Night	4:48
8.	"Sister Gypsy"	Blackmore, Night	3:21
9.	"Can't Help Falling in Love" (Elvis Presley cover)	Luigi Creatore, Hugo Peretti, George David Weiss	2:51
10.	"Peasant's Promise"	trad., Blackmore, Night	5:33
11.	"Far Far Away"	Kenn Machin	3:54
12.	"Empty Words"	trad., Blackmore, Night	2:40

== Release history ==
Country	Date
Germany	27 June 2008
Europe	30 June 2008
United States	15 July 2008

== Charts ==
Chart (2008)	Peak position
Austrian Albums (Ö3 Austria)	40
Dutch Albums (Album Top 100)	95
Finnish Albums (Suomen virallinen lista)	38
German Albums (Offizielle Top 100)	14
Italian Albums (FIMI)	42
Swedish Albums (Sverigetopplistan)	44
Swiss Albums (Schweizer Hitparade)	67
USA (Billboard New Age Albums Chart)	1
