= Paris Moon =

Video by Blackmore's Night
- Released: 6 November 2007
- Recorded: September 20, 2006 at Paris, France's famed Olympia Theatre
- Genre: folk, neo-Medieval
- Length: 128 minutes
- Label: Steamhammer / SPV (USA); Rsk Entertainment (UK)

Blackmore's Night chronology
Winter Carols (2006)	Paris Moon (2007)	Secret Voyage (2008)

Paris Moon is a long-form concert DVD/CD shot released by the band Blackmore's Night in 2007. This release celebrates the band's 10-year anniversary with a concert in the Paris Olympia in 2006.

The band runs through a number of cover songs, including Jethro Tull's "Rainbow Blues," Joan Baez' "Diamonds and Rust," Joan Osborne's "Saint Teresa," and a couple songs from Ritchie's previous bands: Deep Purple's "Soldier of Fortune" and Rainbow's "Ariel" (though this song was actually written by Night and Blackmore).

Also included is a photo gallery with photos from the show, set to "Streets of London", sung by Night in French.

Included with the DVD is a CD containing nine tracks from the concert, as well as a studio version of "The Village Lanterne" and a radio edit of "All Because of You".

Paris Moon was nominated to the New Age Reporter Lifestyle Music Award in three categories: Best Vocal Album, Best Album and Best Celtic Album.

== Track listing ==
=== DVD ===
1. "Introduction"
2. "Past Time With Good Company"
3. "Rainbow Blues"
4. "Play Minstrel Play"
5. "World of Stone"
6. "Under a Violet Moon"
7. "Soldier of Fortune"
8. "Durch Den Wald Zum Bachhaus"
9. "Diamonds and Rust"
10. "Minstrel Hall"
11. "Home Again"
12. "Streets of London"
13. "Renaissance Faire"
14. "Keyboard Solo"
15. "Ariel"
16. "Loreley"
17. "The Clock Ticks On"
18. "Fires at Midnight"
19. "St. Teresa"
20. "The Village Lanterne"

=== CD ===
1. "Past Time With Good Company/Rainbow Blues"
2. "Play Minstrel Play"
3. "World of Stone"
4. "Under a Violet Moon"
5. "Minstrel Hall"
6. "Home Again"
7. "Ariel"
8. "The Clock Ticks On"
9. "Fires at Midnight"

=== Bonus tracks ===
1. "The Village Lanterne" (Studio Version)
2. "All Because of You" (Radio Edit)
3. "The Village Lanterne" (Enhanced Video Track)

== Line-up/Musicians ==
- Ritchie Blackmore - electric & acoustic guitars, tambourine, hurdy-gurdy, mandola
- Candice Night - lead & backing vocals, shawms, rauschpfeife, pennywhistles, chanters, cornamuse
- Sir Robert of Normandie - bass, rhythm guitar, backing vocals
- Bard David of Larchmont - keyboards, vocals
- Squire Malcom of Lunley - drums, percussions
- Lady Madeline - back up vocals
- Lady Nancy - back up vocals
