= Jon Oliva's Pain =

American heavy metal band

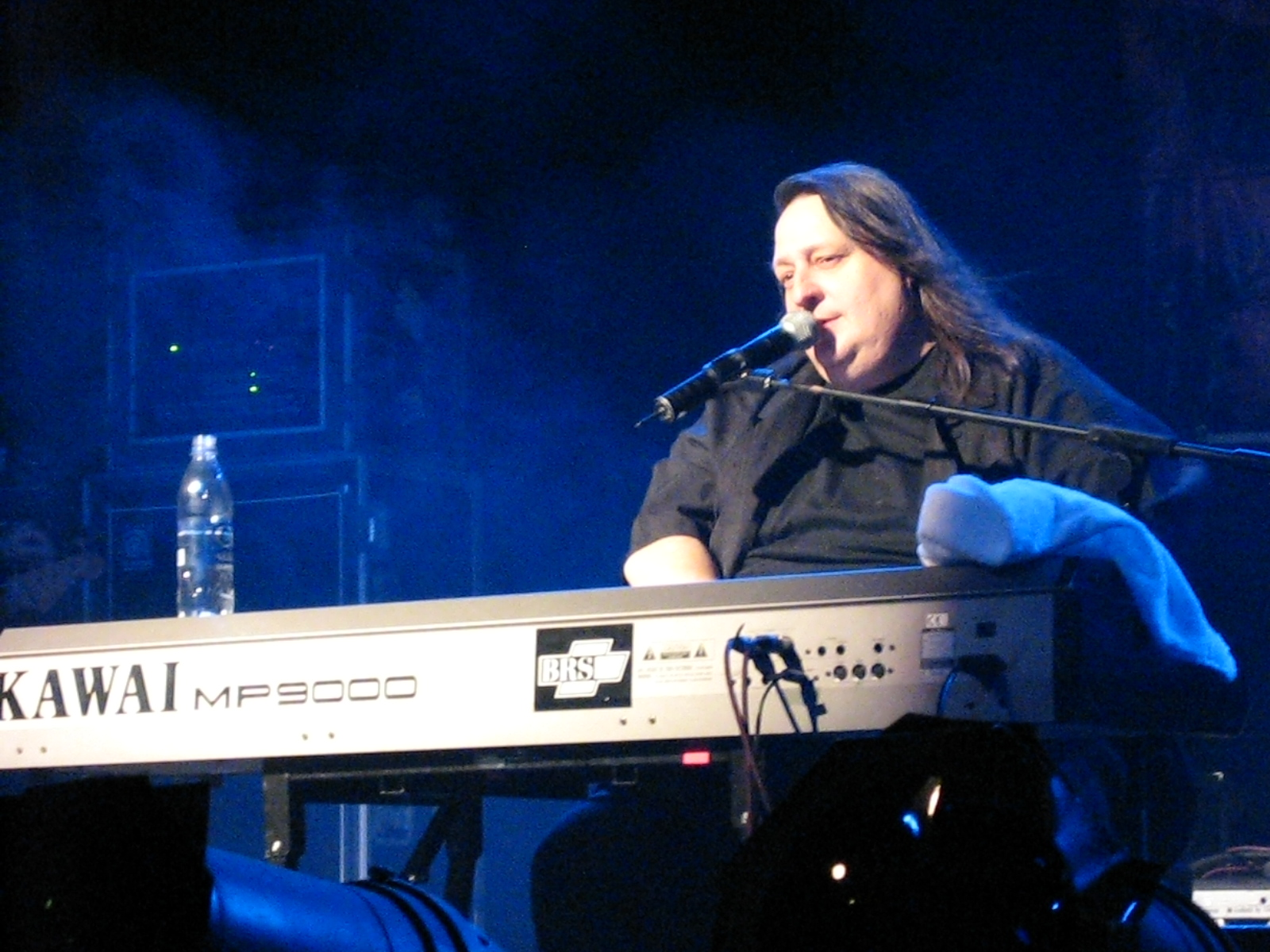
- Jon Oliva's Pain at ProgpowerUK 2, Cheltenham, England, 2007

Background information
- Also known as: The Jon Oliva Project
- Origin: Clearwater, Florida, U.S.
- Genres: Heavy metal, progressive metal
- Years active: 2003–2019
- Labels: SPV/Steamhammer, AFM
- Members: Jon Oliva; Bill Hudson; Joe Diaz; Jason Jennings; Christopher Kinder
- Website: jonoliva.net

Jon Oliva's Pain (sometimes referred to as JOP) was a heavy metal musical project of Savatage co-founder Jon Oliva.

== History ==
Originally, the project consisted entirely of solo recordings by Oliva, but after several months of work he was joined by former members of Circle II Circle to form a band.

The band's first performance was at the Criss Oliva Memorial Concert in 2003, where Oliva played a set of 6 songs from his solo catalog plus "In the Dream" from Power of the Night, "Hey Bulldog" by The Beatles and a cover of "Wishing Well" by the band Free (which was covered by Savatage on their album Fight for the Rock). Joining Jon on stage that night were Matt LaPorte (guitar), John Zahner (keyboards), Jason Jennings (bass), and Christopher Kinder (drums). Initially, the band went out on tour in December 2003 under the name "The Jon Oliva Project", but this was later changed to "'Tage Mahal". The band's name was changed after discovering the blues musician Taj Mahal. Because of the laws surrounding consumer confusion, Oliva instructed the band's name be changed to Jon Oliva's Pain, "Pain" being the working title of the band's first album. The music and themes bear comparison with the likes of Alice Cooper, focusing as they do on elements of obsession, pain, confusion and insanity. Oliva himself cites The Beatles, Queen and The Who amongst his and hence the band's influences.

After hearing the results of their earliest studio sessions together, Oliva then decided to repeat the solo work from scratch with the band. The band embraced the opportunity without hesitation and brought in former Circle II Circle bass player Kevin Rothney to solidify the line-up. The band released their first album 'Tage Mahal on the SPV label in 2004. Originally slated to be released on the same label in May 2006, JOP subsequently signed to AFM Records for the release of the follow-up entitled Maniacal Renderings, which was due for release on September 4, 2006. Oliva cites SPV's reluctance to promote the previous record as a major factor in his decision to move labels. Oliva credits his late brother Criss (with whom he founded Savatage) as co-writing some of the work on the album (particularly the track "The Answer"), after finding some working tapes they had recorded together shortly before Criss's death in a road accident in 1993.

A tour taking them through most of Summer 2006 saw the band appearing at festivals in Europe. The tour reportedly included the performance of two Savatage songs at each concert. During a performance at the UK's ProgPower festival in March 2007, Oliva and the band paid tribute to one of Savatage's works, Streets: A Rock Opera, by playing a majority of the album in running order for the first time as a "gift" to fans. Oliva remarked that some of the songs had never been performed live in the 16 years since the album's first release.

Interviews pointed to a third album being recorded by the band in late 2007 ready for a release by AFM Records in January or February 2008. In January 2008, a release date in April via AFM was confirmed for the new album, entitled Global Warning, with the band announcing that the new album has now been both mixed and mastered. After the album's release, the band embarked on a tour of North America and Europe with new guitarist Tom McDyne along with Circle II Circle and Manticora. The tour meant that Jon Oliva shared the stage with Zachary Stevens for the first time in almost 10 years. At the conclusion of the tour, the band announced that it had commenced pre-production on its fourth release, with a due date of 2009. The band toured the United States and Europe once more in 2009.

The fourth release, entitled Festival, was released in February 2010. Plans for a live DVD to be filmed in 2009 were rescheduled, with a concert at 013 in Tilburg, Netherlands in October 2010 being tentatively scheduled for filming with a view to a live-DVD release in 2011. A live DVD release will mark the first time that Oliva will handle solo lead vocal material over much of his material. In September 2010, it was announced that due to "undisclosed personal reasons", both Tom McDyne and Kevin Rothney would be forced to sit-out the band's European tour and DVD filming. Former touring guitar player from the 'Tage Mahal tour, Jerry Outlaw was tapped to play guitars, with Jason Gaines, described as "Tampa's phenom bass player" replacing Rothney for the duration of the tour. As yet the DVD has still not been released. The band did however record their show in Florida in April 2012, the first night of a short tour celebrating the 25th Anniversary of Savatage's Hall of The Mountain King album, for a DVD release, and it now looks likely this will be released before the Festival tour one.

Oliva revealed that he would not travel with the Trans-Siberian Orchestra during their European tour in a statement released in March 2011. On April 20, 2011; guitarist Matt LaPorte died suddenly at his home.

Oliva stated in a 2019 interview for "The Sound Affect Show" that the band no longer exists following the death of Matt LaPorte, and because of his busy schedule.

== Members ==
Former members

- Jon Oliva – vocals, piano, keyboards, guitar (2003–2019)
- Matt LaPorte – guitar (2003–2011; his death)
- Kevin Rothney – bass, backing vocals (2003–2010)
- Christopher Kinder – drums, backing vocals (2003–2019)
- Shane French – guitar (2005–2007)
- Tom McDyne – guitar (2007–2010)
- Jason Jennings – bass (2003; 2012–2019)
- Bill Hudson – guitar (2014–2019)

Touring members

- Jerry Outlaw - guitar (2004–2005)
- Jason Gaines – bass (2010–2011)

Guest members

- Steve "Doc" Wacholz – drums (guest on 'Tage Mahal)
- Ralph Santolla – guitars (guest on Global Warning)

== Discography ==
=== Studio albums ===
Year	Album details	Peak chart positions
Year	Album details	GER
2004	'Tage Mahal: Released: July 25, 2004; Label: SPV/Steamhammer (SPV08599122); Formats: CD, download	—
2006	Maniacal Renderings: Released: September 4, 2006; Label: AFM (AFMCD129); Formats: CD, download	86
2008	Global Warning: Released: March 21, 2008; Label: AFM (AFM 185-2); Formats: CD, download	—
2010	Festival: Released: February 19, 2010; Label: AFM (AFM 288-9); Formats: CD, LP, download	87
"—" denotes releases that did not chart or were not released in that country.

=== EPs ===
Year	Album details	Notes
2006	Straight Jacket Memoirs: Released: June 23, 2006; Label: AFM (AFMSG129); Formats: CD, download	First release for new label, AFM Records.; Features two live tracks originally released on 'Tage Mahal.
