= Chris Caffery =

American guitarist

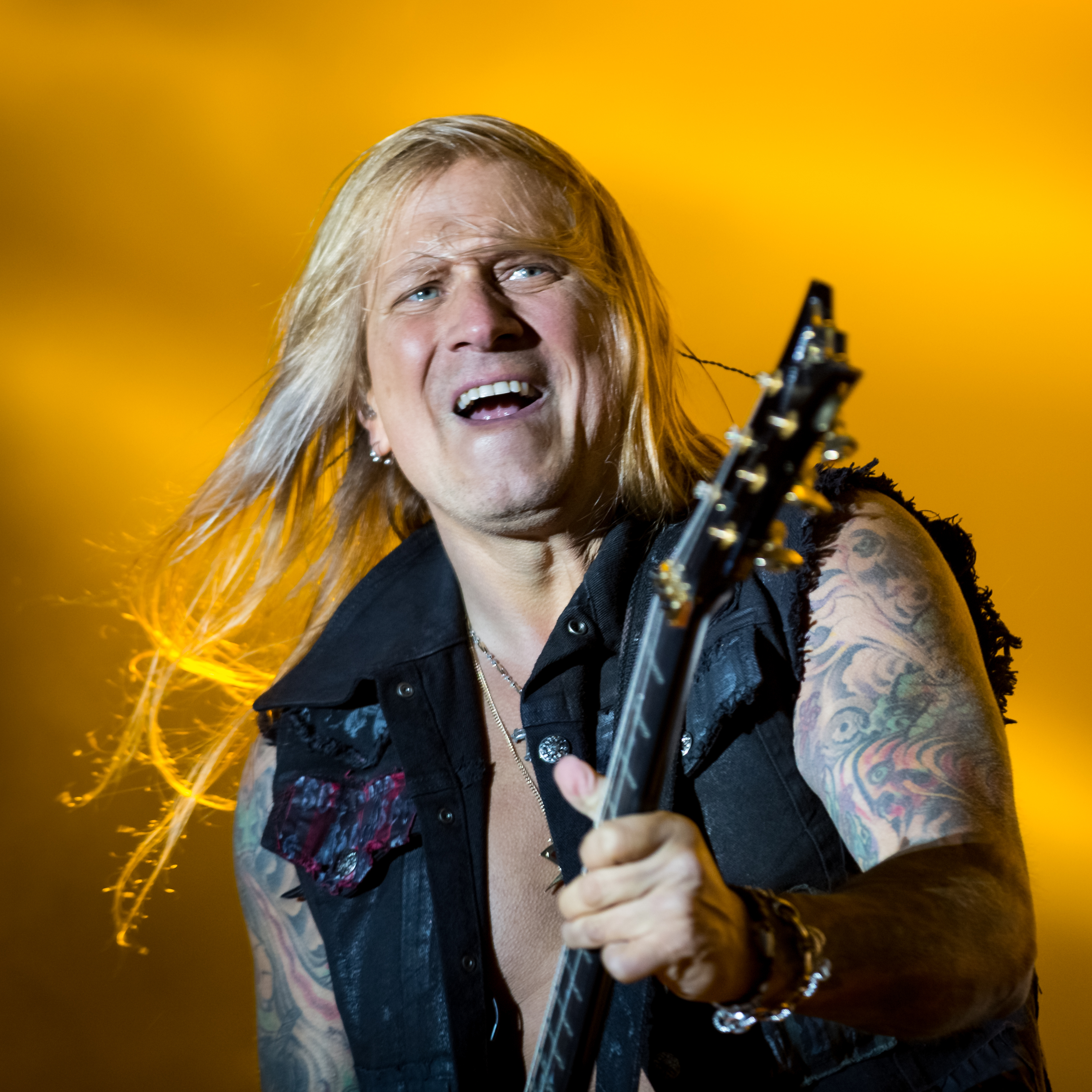
- Caffery performing in 2015

Background information
- Born: Christopher Caffery; September 9, 1967 (age 58); Suffern, New York, U.S.
- Genres: Heavy metal; progressive metal; power metal; thrash metal
- Occupations: Musician; songwriter
- Instruments: Guitar; vocals; keyboards
- Years active: 1984–present
- Member of: Savatage; Trans-Siberian Orchestra; Artension; Spirits of Fire
- Formerly of: Metalium; Doctor Butcher; Doro; Metal Church
- Website: chriscaffery.com

Christopher Caffery (born September 9, 1967) is an American heavy metal guitarist, best known for his work as a member of Savatage and the Trans-Siberian Orchestra. Caffery has been releasing solo records singing and playing guitar for almost 20 years, releasing nine albums and many singles since 2004.

== Biography ==
Raised in Mahwah, New Jersey, Caffery began playing guitar at age 11, but some of his earliest memories include performing the Beatles song Help! for a show and tell in kindergarten. Caffery's favorite bands growing up included the Beatles, Kiss, Black Sabbath, Judas Priest and Rush among others. He has cited guitarists such as Ted Nugent, Rik Emmett, Ace Frehley, Randy Rhoads, Michael Schenker as influences throughout the years as well.

After only 13 months, Caffery grew bored with guitar lessons and decided to teach himself. He was part of a band called "Blitzkrieg" in middle school and played a few shows, the first of which was at a bar in Ridgewood, New Jersey when Caffery was only 13. At the age of 14, he and his brother formed a band called "Anti". Caffery graduated from Goshen Central High School in 1984 and went on to become a professional musician, teaching students during the day and playing shows in the night.

Caffery recorded his first demo tape at age 14 and his second at 17, which got him his first national gig. Caffery was in New York City one night, hanging around in a club in the middle of Times Square, when he met the lead singer of a band called Heaven named Allan Fryar. They were looking for a guitarist and Caffery asked if he could give Allan a tape. A week later and Fryar called, and it turned out that the band also needed a drummer, so Caffery's brother Phil joined. The band was managed by David Krebs and a certain Paul O'Neill, who Caffery would maintain close ties for most of his career.

Paul O'Neill was later introduced to the Oliva brothers, Jon and Criss of Savatage by an Atlantic Records rep and O'Neill left Heaven to work with Savatage. Eventually, Paul invited Caffery to New York, where they recorded the CD and introduced Caffery to the band. But, Caffery soon learned that a second guitarist may be needed in Savatage, so he learned all of the Savatage songs he could in time for Savatage's 1987-1988 tour with Dio and Megadeth. Savatage hired someone else, which left Caffery very upset and he flew himself down to the audition. Caffery was given the opportunity to perform, played 2 songs before the band stopped and hired him on the spot. The band went on tour, but Caffery was kept on the side of the stage, hidden from the audience. Caffery was only 20 years old and playing arenas and was happy, but miserable. He left Savatage after the arena tour.

Caffery bounced between bands for a couple of years until he came into contact with the Oliva brothers once more. They asked Caffery to join them just as the Gutter Ballet album was finished; despite the fact that he never played on the album, Caffery was credited with guitars and keyboards and is pictured in its booklet "both to prepare the fans for the line-up they'd see on tour and confirm his permanent member status". He agreed to join Savatage, but the road took its toll on the band. With outside pressure to finish their dreams of a band together Caffery regretfully quit Savatage at the end of the tour and formed Witchdoctor, with his brother Phil on drums, Hal Patino of King Diamond on bass, and future TSO West member Doug Kistner on keyboards. The band played all over America however the brothers were not clicking musically and the band disbanded. Caffery was contacted to perform on Savatage's Streets tour, but issues meant this did not happen. Caffery soon learned that Jon Oliva had left Savatage. Caffery called Jon, who invited him to Florida, and over "10 bottles of Jack Daniels", their project Doctor Butcher was born.

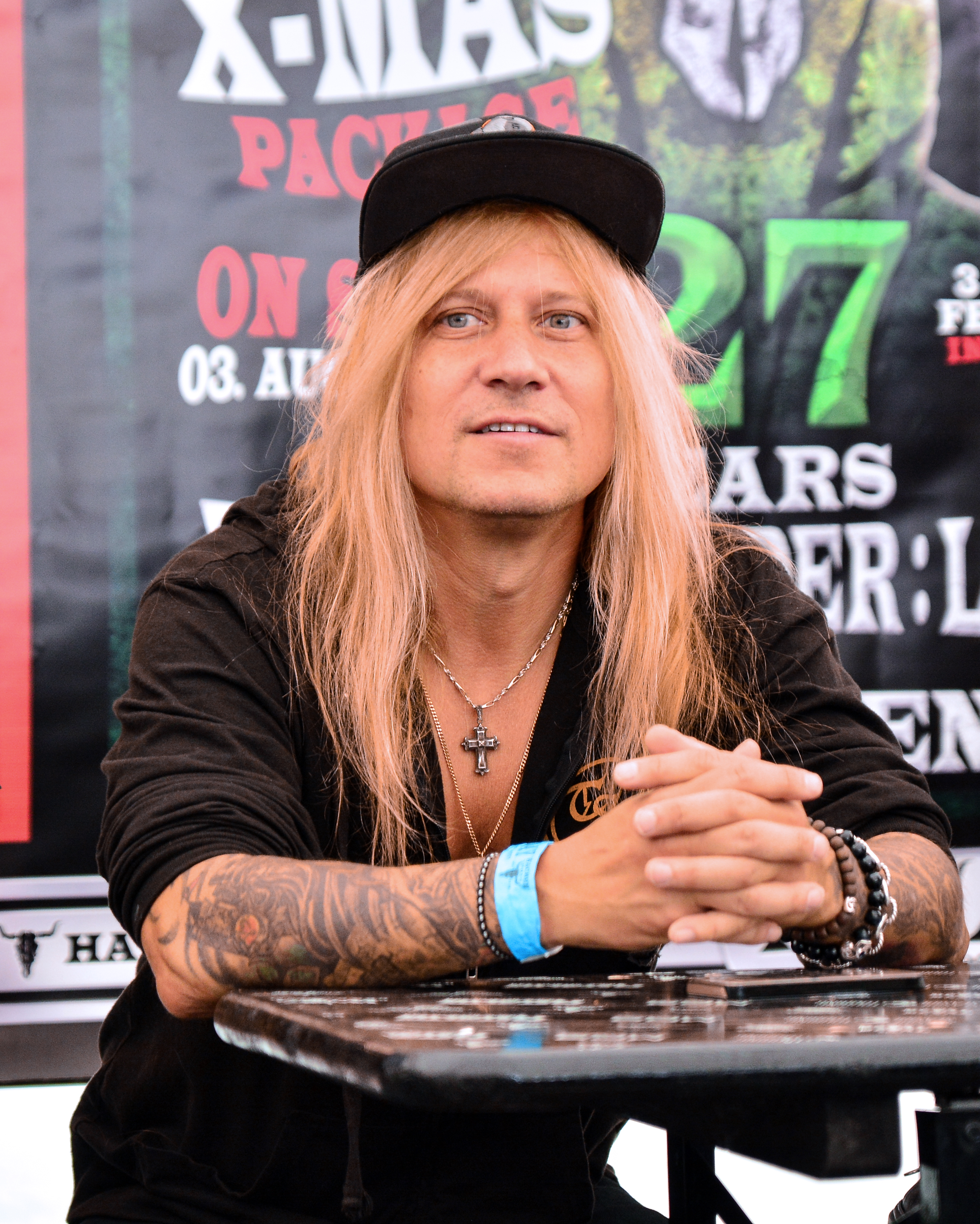
Caffery with Savatage in 2015

Zachary Stevens replaced Jon in Savatage, but Jon continued to work with his brother Criss on the record. Caffery was again asked to re-join the band, but, he stayed loyal to Jon and Butcher. Some initial demos were recorded with Hal Patino and Gene Barnett for Butcher, but bad press over Jon's health lead Atlantic Records to make a decision - Doctor Butcher or Savatage? Atlantic chose Savatage. Caffery was left disheartened. Caffery went to work with friend Ray Gillen of Badlands fame, but Gillen died shortly after the project began. Around this time, Criss Oliva was killed in a car accident by a drunk driver on October 17, 1993. Caffery was asked for the fourth time to join Savatage, but Atlantic Records suggested Alex Skolnick join the band instead. Caffery would later work with Alex on the TSO East touring company. Butcher was signed in Europe and their debut was recorded in 1994. Jon Oliva left to do the Handful of Rain tour with Savatage so Butcher never toured. Caffery, this time, enquired about joining Savatage on a more permanent basis with Jon Oliva, as a close friend and student of Criss Oliva he felt he could pay respect to Criss "spiritually" on stage. Jon agreed, and Caffery was joined by Al Pitrelli, a good friend of his from New York. The two formed a steady partnership for almost 6 years, recording both 1995's Dead Winter Dead and 1998's The Wake of Magellan together.

During this time, Caffery recorded with Joe Lynn Turner, TM Stevens, as well as produced and recorded for Metalium. Caffery was featured on tribute CDs for Guns N' Roses, Accept and Iron Maiden. The Iron Maiden tribute was recorded with Savatage drummer Jeff Plate and his "long time and newly re-acquainted best friend", TSO member, John West. Savatage was stalled a bit in the recording of a follow-up to The Wake of Magellan, due to the tremendous success of the then "side project", Trans-Siberian Orchestra. Caffery considers himself the "ring leader" of TSO East when they tour, and he enjoys performing live with the ensemble. In 1999, Caffery also was a member of the German band Metalium. He is featured on their album Millennium Metal: Chapter One, but left after the album and the following tours.

Al Pitrelli left Savatage in 2000 when he accepted an invitation to replace Marty Friedman in Megadeth. Zak Stevens left shortly after, citing family reasons. Caffery was left as the only guitarist in Savatage and Jon Oliva took up lead vocal duties for the first time in ten years. Caffery played the lead parts with Jack Frost (ironically, who replaced him in Metalium) playing the rhythm parts on a short tour with Fates Warning and Judas Priest in support of 2001's Poets and Madmen. After Megadeth "disbanded" (it later reformed in 2004) in 2002, Al Pitrelli was invited to re-join the band since "he never left the family anyway".

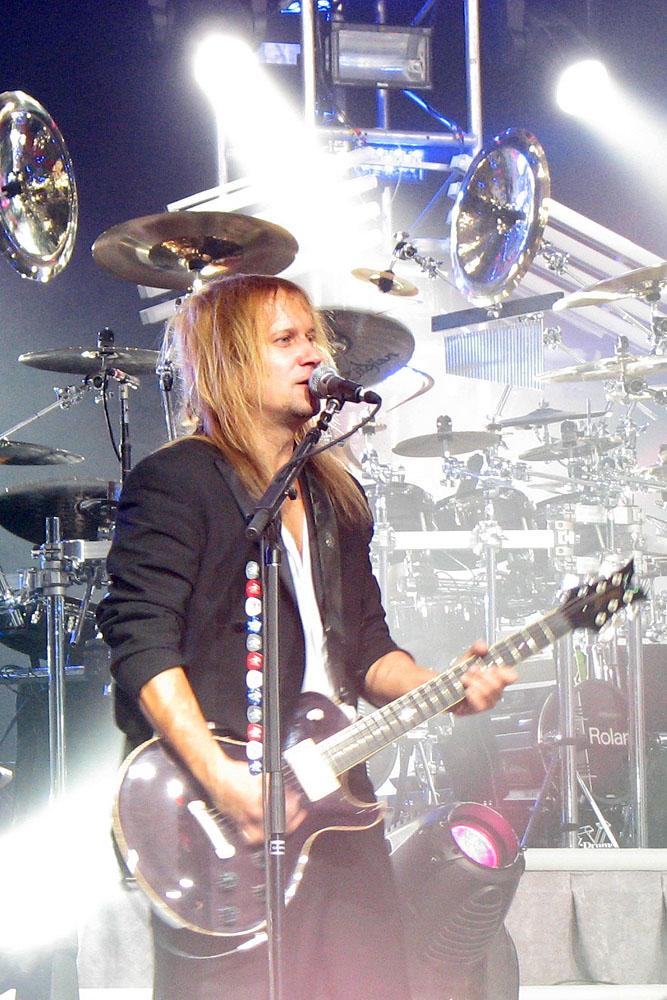
Caffery playing with the Trans-Siberian Orchestra in 2007

Since the release of Savatage's most recent CD, Caffery has recorded on releases records of Savatage alumni, including Zak Stevens's Circle II Circle and on Jon Oliva's Pain records. Caffery himself released solo EPs and albums in 2004 and 2005, with a follow-up full-length album, Pins and Needles released in 2007. Caffery is also worked on TSO's new album Night Castle, released on October 27, 2009.

Musically Caffery recorded on several releases as a guest musician. He also toured as the guitarist for the legendary German Metal vocalist Doro as well as a solo tour supporting Heaven and Hell with Tim "Ripper" Owens' band in Europe. He co-wrote and played the guitars on the song "The Shadows Are Alive" on Tim's first solo release entitled "Play my Game".

TSO continues its yearly Winter tours and also performed three tours for its Beethoven's Last Night CD. The second tour saw TSO cross overseas to Europe for the very first time.

In addition to several more guest appearances and collaborations Caffery also appears regularly with 18 time Grammy award winner Jimmy Sturr. He also starred as a guest on two episodes of his national TV show.

Caffery's other ventures include personal and online guitar instruction, additional culinary adventures, book writing, painting/sketching, photography, musical production and public speaking.

Caffery is currently writing new material for an upcoming solo release, with songs co-written with Jon Oliva as well as several other musical projects.

In 2016, Caffery played lead guitar with thrash metal band Metal Church, as a touring substitute for regular guitarist, Rick Van Zant, and playing alongside his Savatage bandmate Jeff Plate.

== Solo band members ==
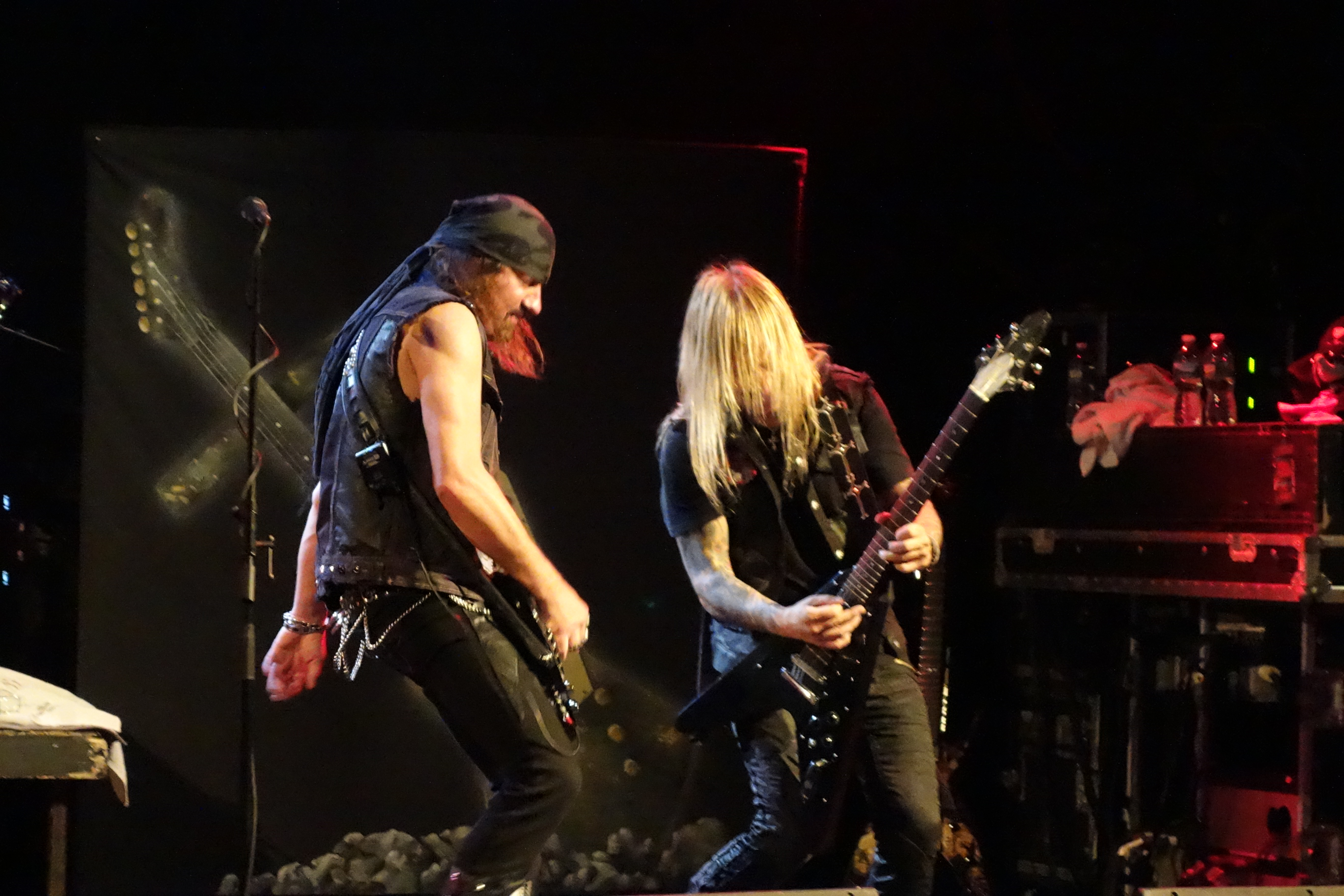
Caffery (right) and Steve Unger performing with Metal Church in 2016

=== Current ===
- Chris Caffery – lead vocals, guitar, bass guitar, keyboards, saxophone (Savatage, Metalium, Trans-Siberian Orchestra, John West, Doctor Butcher)
- Nick Douglas – bass guitar (Doro, Blaze)
- Paul LaPlaca – keyboards, guitar (ZO2, October Thorns, Zandelle)
- John Macaluso – drums (Starbreaker, Mullmuzzler, MCM, Riot, Holy Mother, TNT, Masterplan, Powermad, Ark, Yngwie J. Malmsteen, John Macaluso & Union Radio)

=== Former ===
- Dave Z – bass guitar (Trans-Siberian Orchestra, Doctor Butcher, ZO2)
- Steve Unger – bass guitar (Metal Church)
- Jeff Plate – drums (Savatage, Wicked Witch, Trans-Siberian Orchestra, Metal Church)
- Ira Black – guitar (Attika7, Doom Society, Heathen, Lizzy Borden, Vicious Rumors, Pornucopia)
- Paul Morris – keyboards (Rainbow, Doro, Doctor Butcher)

== Discography ==
=== With Big Mouth ===
- 1988 – Quite Not Right (credited on album as 'Lead Guitar, Vocals') played with Big Mouth and recorded on the album release in 1987, but not released until 1988. He left Big Mouth after recording the album and appearing in the music video for the song "Big Mouth" so he could audition for and join Savatage.

=== With Savatage ===
- 1990 – Gutter Ballet (never actually played on this album, despite being credited as an official member)
- 1995 – Dead Winter Dead
- 1995 – Ghost in the Ruins – A Tribute to Criss Oliva
- 1997 – The Wake of Magellan
- 2001 – Poets and Madmen

=== With Doctor Butcher ===
- 1994 – Doctor Butcher

=== With Trans-Siberian Orchestra ===
- 1996 – Christmas Eve and Other Stories
- 1998 – The Christmas Attic
- 2000 – Beethoven's Last Night
- 2004 – The Lost Christmas Eve
- 2009 – Night Castle
- 2012 – Dreams of Fireflies
- 2015 – Letters From the Labyrinth

=== With Metalium ===
- 1999 – Millennium Metal – Chapter One

=== With Spirits of Fire ===
- 2019 – Spirits of Fire
- 2022 - Embrace The Unknown

=== Solo artist ===
- 2004 – The Mold EP
- 2004 – Music Man EP
- 2005 – Faces
- 2005 – W.A.R.P.E.D.
- 2007 – Pins and Needles
- 2009 – House of Insanity
- 2015 – Your Heaven Is Real
- 2018 – The Jester's Court

=== Guest appearances ===
- 2002 – John West's "Earthmaker" album. Guitars on all songs and co writing.
- 2002 – Doro's Fight (featured on the tracks "Salvaje" and "Descent")
- 2003 – Circle II Circle's Watching in Silence (featured on the tracks "Out of Reach", "Sea of White" and "Face to Face,")
- 2004 – Doro' Classic Diamonds – The DVD
- 2006 – Eidolon's The Parallel Otherworld (featured guitar solo on track "The Eternal Call")
- 2008 – KISS MY ANKH: A Tribute To Vinnie Vincent (guitar solo on track "Ted Poley," parody of Kiss song "Unholy, performed by C.C. Banana")
- 2008 – Sandalinas's Fly to the Sun (featured on the tracks "Double Cross", "Shadows in the Rain")
- 2009 – Tim "Ripper" Owens' Play My Game
- 2011 – Ronnie Munroe – "Lords of the Edge" – co writing and guitar on "Rock in a Hard Place"
- 2013 – Sandalinas's Power to the People, The Raw E.P (featured on the track "Power to the People")
- 2013 – Artlantica's "Across the Seven Seas" – Guest guitar solos
- 2015 – Exxiles (Oblovion) Act I
- 2021 – Burning Witches's The Witch of the North (featured on the track "Hall of the Mountain King")
- 2021 – Exxiles (Reminiscence) Act II
