= Jon Oliva =

American heavy metal singer (born 1960)

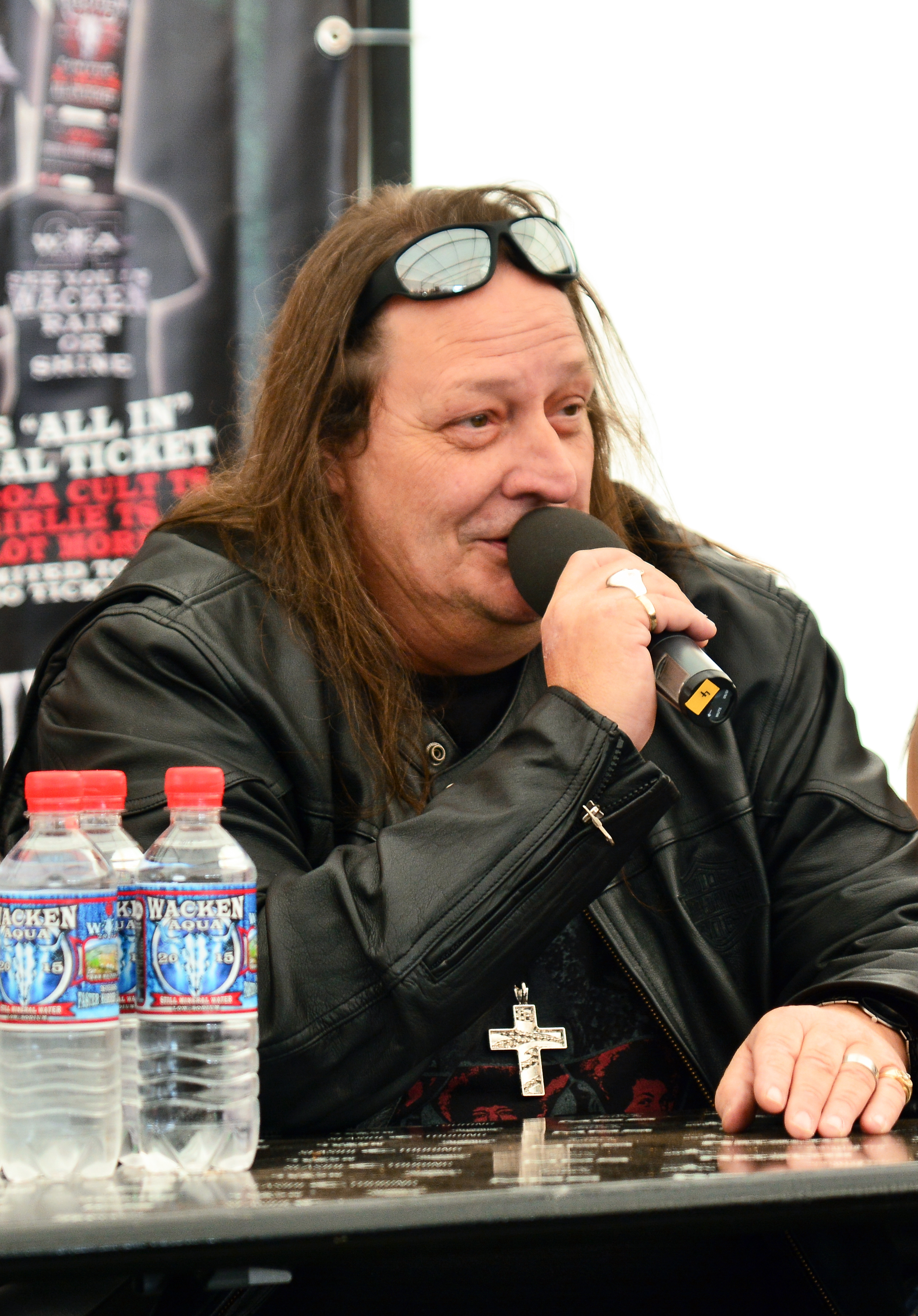
- Oliva at Wacken Open Air 2015

Background information
- Born: John Nicholas Oliva; July 22, 1959 (age 67); The Bronx, New York, U.S.
- Genres: Heavy metal; progressive metal; symphonic metal
- Occupations: Singer; musician; songwriter
- Instruments: Vocals; piano; keyboards; guitar; bass
- Years active: 1978–present
- Member of: Savatage; Trans-Siberian Orchestra
- Formerly of: Doctor Butcher; Jon Oliva's Pain
- Website: jonoliva.net

John Nicholas "Jon" Oliva (born July 22, 1959) is an American singer and musician. He is best known as the co-founder, keyboardist and lead vocalist of the heavy metal band Savatage, which he co-founded with his younger brother Criss Oliva. Since 1996 he has also been a songwriter, musician and vocalist in Trans-Siberian Orchestra. Producer Paul O'Neill referred to Oliva in numerous interviews as the single greatest vocalist/musician he has ever worked with.

== Biography ==
=== Early life ===
"My dad is a piano player, and we always had a piano in the house, so I started messing around with that. I was probably like 11 or 12. I was very impatient, so I kind of blew that by. There were [also] guitars around the house. It was just a gradual thing – a little bit of everything here and there. We bought a bass, because we had guitars, piano and drums – the one thing we didn't have was a bass. So we went out and bought this shitty, teardrop-shaped, green bass, probably the ugliest bass in the whole world. It had black nylon strings – it was really awful. The strings [were] like six inches off the fretboard, but we had a bass, and I started dabbling with that. It was just a little bit of everything at one time."

— Jon Oliva

Oliva was born in The Bronx, New York City. His family moved around a lot when Jon and Criss were young, living in California for four years until moving to Florida in 1976. Much like his brother Criss, Jon found music his calling during the family's time in California. Starting off with his father's piano, Jon dabbled in guitars, pianos and drums before buying "a really ugly bass". Jon and Criss continued their musical exploits and played a block party, playing Kiss, Deep Purple and ZZ Top covers. Although originally the guitar player of the brothers, Jon quickly realized Criss's talent was superior to his and stuck to singing and swapped with his brother and played bass.

Having been kicked out of high school in 1978, Jon needed a job, and was lucky enough to join a band called Metropolis, a band playing Bad Company and Alice Cooper cover songs. This gave Jon his first touring experience as the band played bars and clubs in various parts of Florida, but Jon quickly grew tired of the bars and clubs, leaving the band later that year.

Jon and Criss re-united to form Avatar, out of their two most recent bands, Alien and Tower respectively. Avatar would later become Savatage. Earning the envy of most other Floridan bands due to their "awesome equipment", Avatar was originally a five-piece, with Jon on drums and vocals, and Criss on guitar. The band slowly drifted apart until Jon and Criss remained, and the two got jobs at "The Pit", a practice shack where they met Steve Wacholz. Wacholz was very familiar with the Oliva brothers, who he first met in 1977. He saw Criss play at a local high school and was blown away. Very soon after, he auditioned for Jon's band, Alien. When he got to the audition, Wacholz recognized Criss and Jon as part of the band who had impressed him so much at the high school show. Steve would eventually join a new version of Avatar, joined later by bass player Keith Collins, who originally knew the band as they hired his equipment. Jon felt restrained by playing instruments and subsequently stuck to being the band's lead vocalist.

Avatar initially received exposure via a free Tampa Bay music publication called Music Magazine, who recommended the band to Tampa radio station WYNF, who were holding a contest for a spot on an LP. Avatar opened both sides of the LP with tracks "Rock Me" and "Minus Love". WYNF also gave the fledgling band concerts. In late 2006, footage was released onto the internet of an early performance by Avatar at a gig in a Clearwater, Florida parking lot and was prominent in featuring an early version of the song "Holocaust", which would later be released on Savatage's first album and a cover of Van Halen's "Eruption" and the latter's version of "You Really Got Me". Avatar's rising local stardom enabled them to record an LP with Par Records. An initial EP, entitled City Beneath the Surface sold 1000 copies, and Par Records invited Avatar back to the studio to record a full album. However, there was an issue with a European band called Avatar who disagreed to the usage of the name, and the band needed to find a solution and fast, as the album was due to be pressed the following day. Jon and Criss were playing cards with their wives when they got a phone call and after initial tweaking, they finally arrived at Savatage. That full album was Sirens, the first Savatage record.

=== Savatage ===
The new name did not change the band's attitude or rave reviews. Quickly, Atlantic Records were becoming interested in the band, and label reps flew in from New York to see the band perform. Atlantic quickly got Savatage signed to a deal, but Savatage finished out their deal with Par, releasing EP The Dungeons Are Calling in 1984. The band's first release for Atlantic was unleashed in 1985, entitled Power of the Night, the album was produced by Max Norman, who had produced the legendary Ozzy Osbourne albums Blizzard of Ozz and Diary of a Madman as well as producing Megadeth's hit 1992 album, Countdown to Extinction among others. During this time, the band hired Johnny Lee Middleton to replace Keith Collins on bass duties due to musical differences.

Savatage were finally getting exposure, but in 1986, the band released Fight for the Rock, a stab at mainstream success that was driven primarily by Atlantic. Jon himself refers to the record as Fight for the Nightmare. The material was written mostly by Jon and Criss in the kitchen of the apartment the band was staying in. Some of the songs were written in the studio, such as "Lady In Disguise." Atlantic put a lot of pressure on the band to become a radio friendly band and this resulted in the two covers of Free's "Wishing Well" and Badfinger's "Day After Day". Fans were confused by the sudden shift in sound Savatage took and sales did not meet expectations. Jon had however described the album as a good "musical and life experience".

The commercial failure of Fight for the Rock nearly broke up the band, during which Jon auditioned for Black Sabbath and Criss had considered joining Megadeth; however, Jon decided that he and Criss "didn't want to split up", and were encouraged by Paul O'Neill to continue Savatage. O'Neill saw that Savatage had the potential to be a big act. 1987's Hall of the Mountain King was released to critical acclaim and is cited by many fans as being one of the band's best works. Two music videos were released and received rotation on MTV, for "24 Hours Ago" and the title track. On the resulting tour, Savatage supported Dio and Megadeth, but Jon had many conflicts with the latter's lead singer Dave Mustaine, who at the time was a serious substance abuser. After hanging out with Mustaine on a 24-hour basis, after the tour, Jon entered rehab.

Jon altered the band's direction into a more progressive sound, and the resulting record was Gutter Ballet, released in 1990. Many of the songs on the album Jon came up with while in rehab, including "Thorazine Shuffle" and "Mentally Yours". The song "Gutter Ballet" was one of the last to be recorded, and was in fact recorded with just Jon and Criss in the studio. After seeing a performance of the Phantom of the Opera in Toronto, Jon was so inspired he wrote "Gutter Ballet" in the studio. Two videos were filmed for the album and again received MTV airplay: "When the Crowds are Gone" and the title track.

In 1991, the band created their first rock opera, Streets. The record did not do as well as the band would have liked, however, as it was released around the time that grunge exploded onto the mainstream music arena. But a video for "Jesus Saves" was recorded and again got airplay and got a new audience to appreciate the band. Jon has stated that his favorite song of all-time was recorded on Streets: Tonight He Grins Again. However, after a tour in support of the album, Jon Oliva left the band. The official reason given was to concentrate on his side-projects Doctor Butcher and his Broadway-bound musical Romanov as well as continuing co-writing Savatage material with his brother Criss and producer Paul O'Neill. Jon's last show was at the first ever Tampa Music Awards in 1992 and in 2006, footage was released onto the internet of this last performance. However, as of 2007, Romanov is in the hands of the Pace Theatrical Group and has gone through several rewrites, but has yet to see the light of day.

Jon hand-picked his Savatage replacement, former Wicked Witch lead vocalist Zachary Stevens and the band recorded their follow-up to Streets, Edge of Thorns in 1993. For the first time, Savatage began to enjoy mainstream recognition, including increased radio play and a world tour. Jon since admitted that he never wanted to be Savatage's only vocalist, and said he left to "take care of myself". Originally, Jon was to leave the band, then return as a lead vocalist on the follow-up record to Edge of Thorns. Around this same time, Jon was approached by one-time Savatage guitarist, Chris Caffery, who recorded with the band on Gutter Ballet. Jon and Chris wrote some songs together and eventually, this became Doctor Butcher. Along with drummer John Osborn, the three went into the studio and made the album for about $8,000. Doctor Butcher played a couple of shows in the Tampa area in 1993, one of which included an appearance by Criss Oliva who joined the band on stage for a rendition of "Sirens". Jon however was hurt that Atlantic Records chose not to release the Butcher record. He was happy for the band, but had mixed emotions, and began to think that he might have been the one holding Savatage back.

However, tragedy struck when Criss Oliva was killed in a car accident by a drunk driver on October 17, 1993. Jon chose to continue the band, although he has since admitted that the band was pretty much over after Criss's death, but only kept going because of his memory and to "keep his music alive". Savatage's 1994 album Handful of Rain is considered Jon Oliva's tribute to his brother. He recorded the album along with Stevens and Alex Skolnick, formerly of Testament. Even though the other Savatage members are credited, Oliva plays the majority of the instruments. Jon made a return to the fore of Savatage on their live release Japan Live '94 which saw him take up lead vocal duties for the first time since 1992, performing a duet on "Gutter Ballet".

Oliva returned to perform vocal duties for Savatage's 1995 album Dead Winter Dead, supplying vocals to the tracks "I Am" and "Doesn't Matter Anyway". However, Jon was not prepared for the success the band would finally achieve, albeit indirectly. The track "Christmas Eve (Sarajevo 12/24)" became a huge hit around Christmas time that year on many radio formats. The song was re-released in 1996 by the new side project of the band, the Trans-Siberian Orchestra. Oliva has stated however that he was saddened about the success of the record, citing the fact that the same song was released by both bands, yet TSO's rendition became a bigger hit. This led Jon to believe that the biggest barrier to success was the Savatage name.

He was featured on the album WWF Full Metal in 1996, singing the song "We're All Together Now" with several WWE professional wrestlers as part of the Slam Jam. An instrumental loop of the track was used as bumper music for the federation's RAW is WAR program until 2002. While featured in other musical projects, he remained involved in every song Savatage recorded, including 1997's The Wake of Magellan, where he was featured as lead vocalist on tracks "Another Way" and "Paragons of Innocence". Shortly after wrapping the recording of The Wake of Magellan, he produced and sang back up vocals for Tampa/Clearwater band Dave's Not Here as a favor to former 98Rock jockey and Dave's Not Here lead vocalist, Todd T. Riley. In 2000, Oliva contributed the song "Perfect Christmas Night" to the Jim Carrey vehicle The Grinch. In 2001, after Stevens left the band citing family reasons, Oliva returned to provide lead vocals for Savatage's new album, Poets and Madmen. It was his first appearance as a lead vocalist on a Savatage studio record in 10 years.

Aside from a short-lived reunion at Wacken Open Air in 2015, Savatage had been mostly inactive since 2002, when the band went on hiatus following the tour cycle for Poets and Madmen. After some speculation that they were reuniting in 2021 to record a new album, Oliva confirmed in an interview with "80's Glam Metalcast" in March of that year that he and his Savatage bandmates Chris Caffery and Al Pitrelli had been working on new material together, and added that he would "love" to reform the band. Rumors of a permanent reunion of Savatage persisted for several years until April 2023, when Oliva confirmed to Rock Hard magazine that the band was planning to release a new album, to which he said would "probably be the last album [they] ever do" and revealed Curtain Call as its working title.

=== Jon Oliva's Pain ===
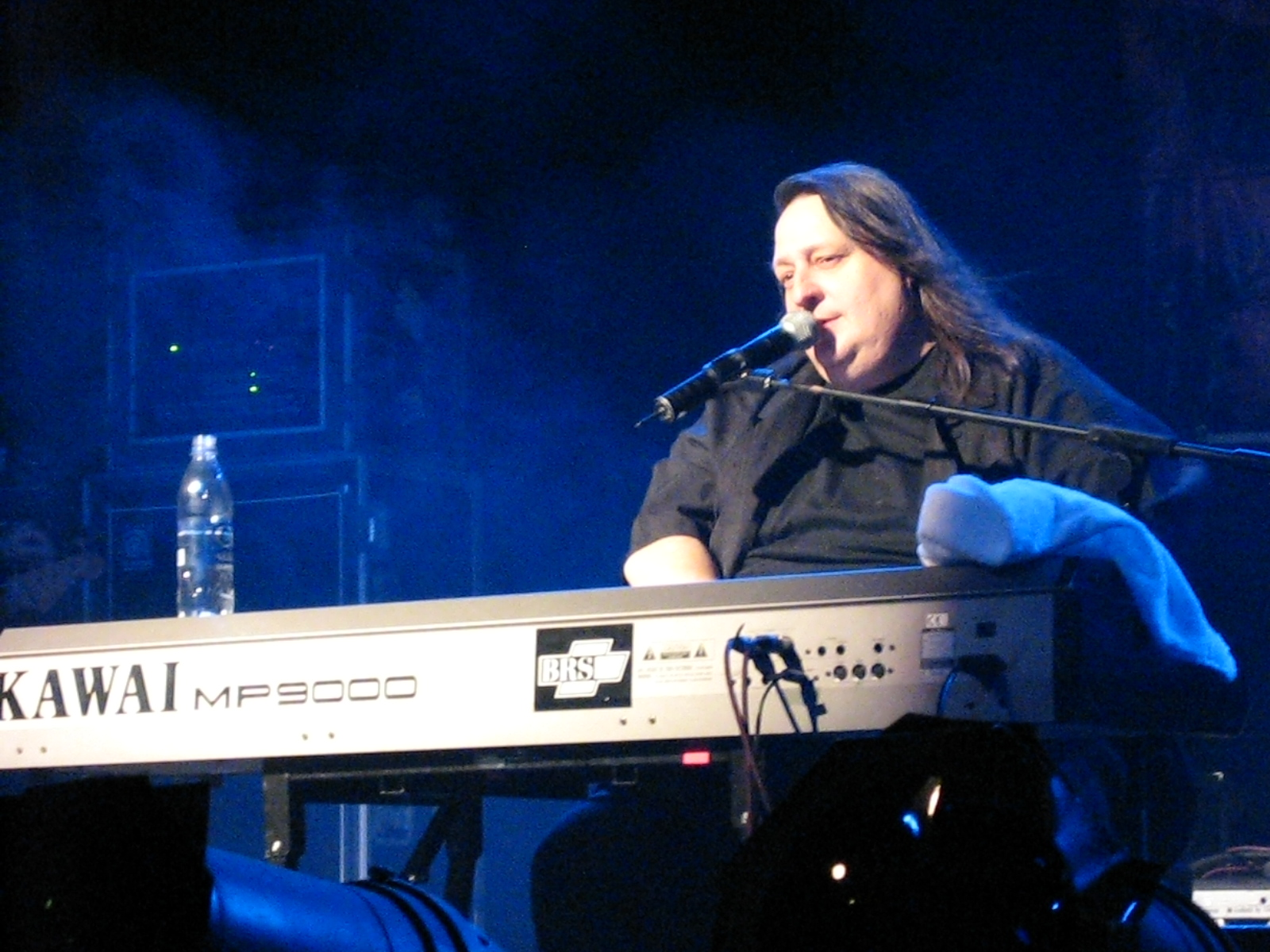
Oliva performing in 2007

After touring and writing with TSO, Oliva formed his own band, Jon Oliva's Pain (JOP), in 2003. JOP released an album entitled 'Tage Mahal in 2004 on the SPV label, then subsequently signed to AFM Records in March 2006 for the release of their second album Maniacal Renderings, which was released on September 4, 2006. JOP's third recording was released on May 6, 2008, and was titled Global Warning. In the last two recordings, JOP has re-worked and re-recorded songs from a collection of old recordings with his brother Criss Oliva.

=== Health issues ===
In April 2016, Oliva suffered a mild stroke from which he fully recovered.

In March 2021, Oliva revealed that he had a battle with COVID-19 for two months the year before.

In September 2023, Oliva suffered a spinal injury which postponed production of the upcoming Savatage album Curtain Call until early 2024: "I slipped on a wet marble floor and I fractured my T7 vertebra. It is very painful; I'm actually in a lot of pain right now. I have to wear this kind of like a harness vest support thing for four months."

In October 2024, Oliva revealed that he was diagnosed with both multiple sclerosis and Ménière's disease and "[his] doctors are working with [him] to get healthy again." As the result of his condition, he did not join Savatage for their first show in almost ten years at the Monsters of Rock festival in São Paulo on April 19, 2025.

== Discography ==
=== Doctor Butcher ===
- 1994 – Doctor Butcher

=== Trans-Siberian Orchestra ===
- 1996 – Christmas Eve and Other Stories
- 1998 – The Christmas Attic
- 2000 – Beethoven's Last Night
- 2004 – The Lost Christmas Eve
- 2009 – Night Castle
- 2015 – Letters From the Labyrinth

=== Solo ===
- 2013 – Raise the Curtain

=== Guest appearances ===
- 1996 – WWF Full Metal (lead vocals on "We're All Together Now")
- 2001 – Symphony of Live by Rough Silk (vocals for the part of God on "Lucifer")
- 2002 – Xiled to Infinity and One by Seven Witches (lyrics and lead vocals on "The Burning (Incubus Reprise)")
- 2005 – W.A.R.P.E.D. by Chris Caffery (lead vocals on "Iraq Attack")
- 2006 – Phoenix by Saidian (guest vocals on "Crown of Creation")
- 2008- A Salute to Metallica (guest vocals on "Nothing Else Matters")
- 2008- All Souls Midnight by Midnight (guest vocals on "Painted Skies")
- 2010 – Angel of Babylon by Avantasia (lead vocals on "Death is Just a Feeling")
- 2010 – Poetry for the Poisoned by Kamelot (guest vocals on "The Zodiac")
- 2010 – Ophidia by Neverland (guest vocals on "Invisible War")
- 2010 – Labyrinth of Truths by Soulspell (guest vocals on "Into The Arc of Time")
- 2011 – guest with (Adnan Al Hamdan) from Syria
- 2012 – Play The Pawn single by Syrian band The Hourglass (guest vocals together with Zak Stevens)
- 2012 – Era by Elvenking (guest vocals on "I Am the Monster" and "Forget-Me-Not")
- 2012 – Serenity by Rockstar Superstar Project (guest vocals on "Claws")
- 2014 – F.E.A.R. by Dawn of Destiny (guest vocals on "No Hope for the Healing")
- 2015 – Breaking Through The Mist by RavenBlack Project (guest vocals on "The Faithless And The Dreamer")
