= List of Savatage band members =

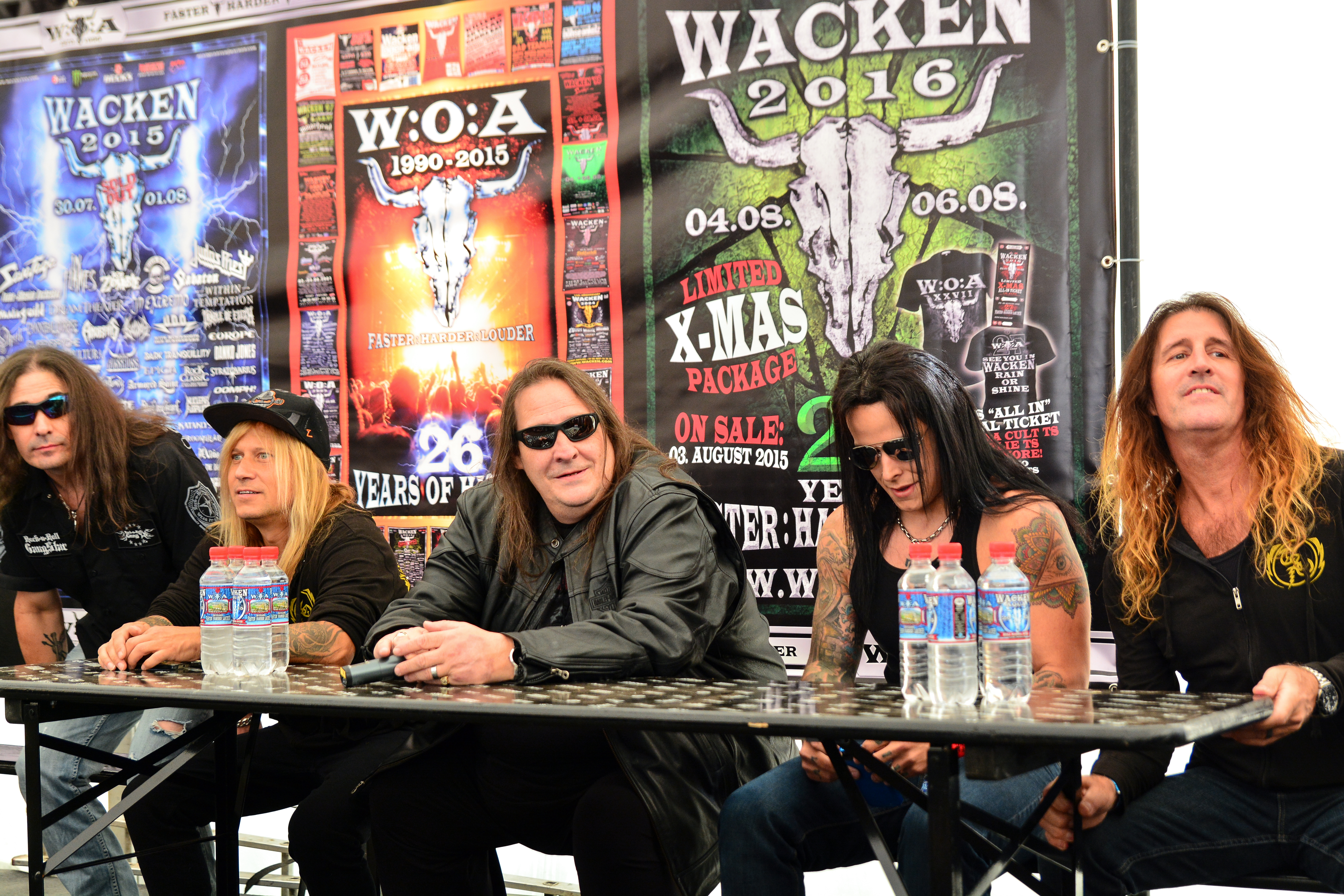
(from left to right) Zachary Stevens, Chris Caffery, Jon Oliva, additional live guitarist Bill Hudson and Jeff Plate

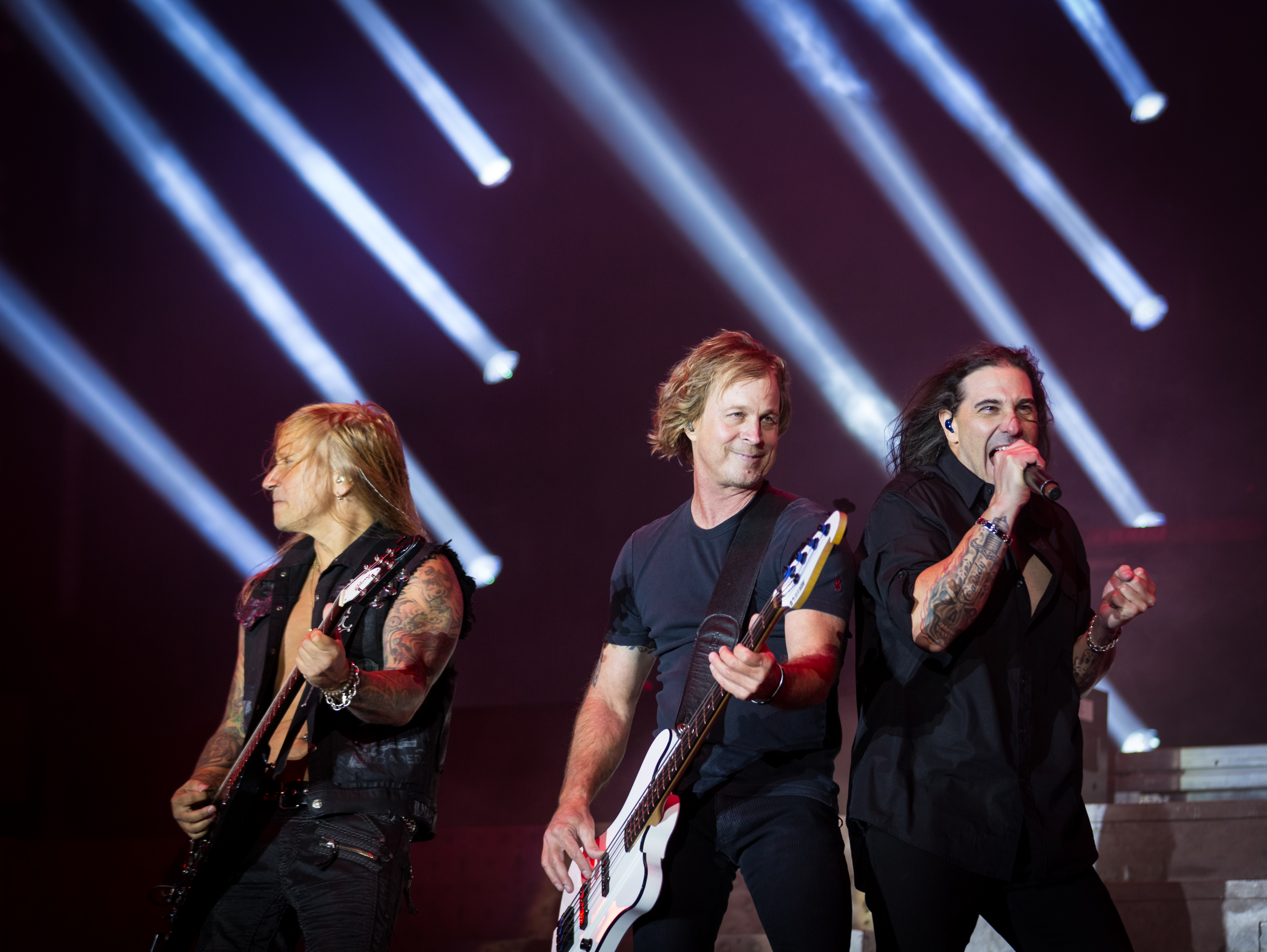
(from left to right) Chris Caffery, Johnny Lee Middleton, Zachary Stevens

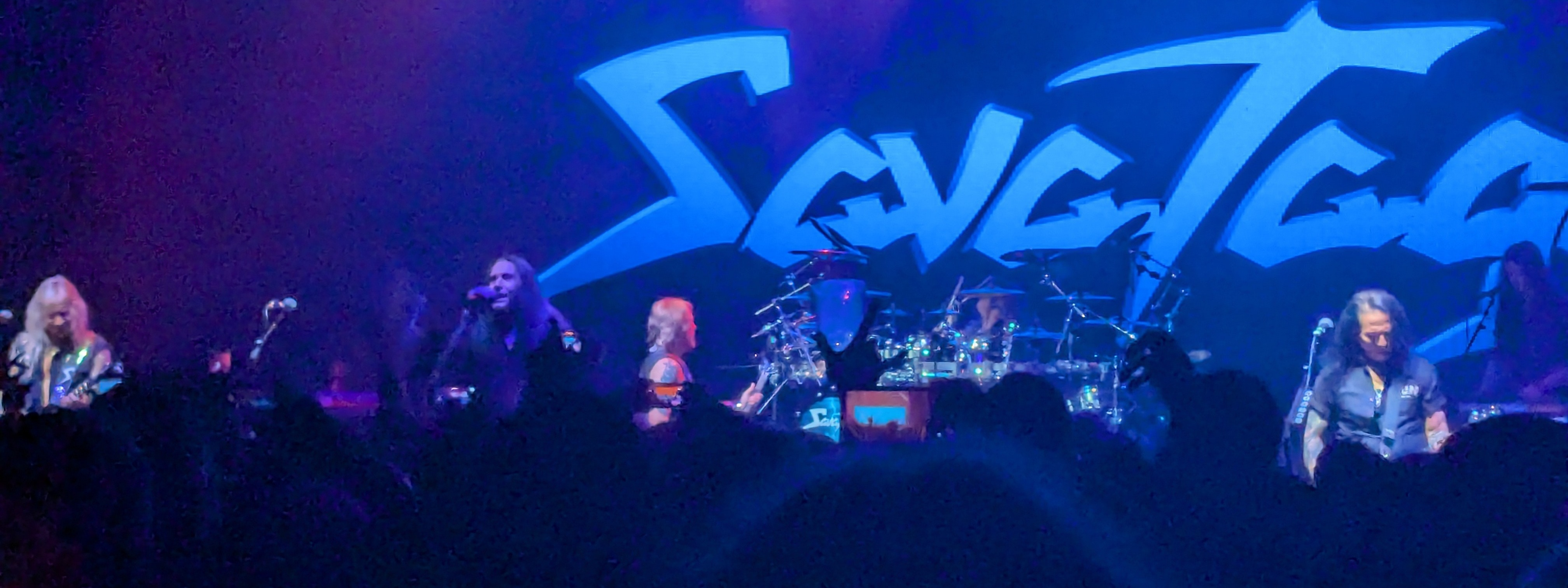
(left to right) Chris Caffery, Zachary Stevens, Johnny Lee Middleton, Jeff Plate and Al Pitrelli

Savatage at Wacken Open Air in 2015 and Shephard's Bush Empire in 2025

Savatage is an American heavy metal band, founded by brothers Jon (vocals) and Criss (guitar) Oliva in 1979 under the name Avatar. The band's first stable lineup in the early eighties also included drummer Steve "Doc" Wacholz, and bassist Keith Collins. Currently the band consists of Jon Oliva, alongside bassist Johnny Lee Middleton (since 1986), guitarist Chris Caffery (who first joined in 1987 as a touring member), singer Zachary Stevens (who first joined in 1992), drummer Jeff Plate (since 1994) and guitarist Al Pitrelli (who first joined in 1995).

== History ==
In 1986 Collins was replaced by Johnny Lee Middleton, and the lineup was expanded in 1987, to include second guitarist Chris Caffery. The nineties began with the band again down to four after Caffery's departure. He was replaced by John Zahner on tour. In 1992 Jon Oliva stepped down as frontman though he remained involved in songwriting. He was replaced by vocalist Zachary Stevens, though Oliva continued to collaborate in the studio. Wacholz also took a hiatus from touring and was replaced by Andy James on tour. The band went on hiatus when Criss Oliva died in a car accident in 1993.

Jon Oliva reformed Savatage in 1994, recording Handful of Rain, with Stevens, new guitarist Alex Skolnick and producer/manager Paul O'Neill. Wacholz and Middleton refused to record as they were grieving Criss Oliva's death. Oliva, Stevens, Skolnick, Middleton and new drummer Jeff Plate all contributed to the supporting tour. The band had a solid lineup from 1995 to 2000 with Al Pitrelli and the returning Caffery replacing Skolnick. In 2000, Stevens and Pitrelli left the band, and Oliva took over lead vocals and Caffery took over lead guitar. In 2001 new members Damond Jiniya (vocals) and Jack Frost (guitar) joined for touring, however Frost was let go in 2002 to make way for the returning Pitrelli, though he was briefly replaced on a tour by Annihilator guitarist Jeff Waters.

In 2014, the band reformed with Oliva/Middleton/Caffery/Stevens/Plate/Pitrelli lineup returning at Wacken Open Air 2015, but were inactive until 2023 when Jon Oliva confirmed work on a new studio album. The band will play their first shows in nearly ten years in the spring and summer of 2025, without Oliva due to his diagnosis of both multiple sclerosis and Ménière's disease.

From 1987 on, Paul O'Neill acted as the band's producer, co-lyricist and co-composer, and leads Trans-Siberian Orchestra along with Jon Oliva and Al Pitrelli. Stevens, Middleton, Caffery and Plate also perform in Trans-Siberian Orchestra, and former guitarist Alex Skolnick has also performed with the group. In April 2017 it was announced that O'Neill had died at the age of 61.

== Members ==
=== Current members ===
Image	Name	Years active	Instruments	Release contributions
	Jon Oliva	1978–1992; 1994–2002; 2014–2015; 2023–present (not touring)	lead and backing vocals; keyboards (since 1983); guitar (1978–1979, 1994); bass (1978, 1994); drums (1981, 1991, 1994)	all releases including session appearance on Edge of Thorns (1993)
	Johnny Lee Middleton	1986–2002; 2014–2015; 2023–present	bass; backing vocals	all releases from Fight for the Rock (1986) onwards, except Handful of Rain (1994)
	Chris Caffery	1987–1988 (touring); 1989–1990; 1994–2002; 2014–2015; 2023–present	lead and rhythm guitar; vocals; keyboards (1987–1990)	Gutter Ballet (1989) (credit only); Ghost in the Ruins – A Tribute to Criss Oliva (1995); Dead Winter Dead (1995); The Wake of Magellan (1997); Poets and Madmen (2001)
	Zachary Stevens	1992–2000; 2014–2015; 2023–present	lead vocals	all releases from Edge of Thorns (1993) to present, except Poets and Madmen (2001)
	Jeff Plate	1994–2002; 2014–2015; 2023–present	drums	all releases from Japan Live '94 (1995) to present
	Al Pitrelli	1995–1999; 2002; 2014–2015; 2023–present	lead and rhythm guitar; backing vocals	Dead Winter Dead (1995); The Wake of Magellan (1997); Poets and Madmen (2001) (session musician)

=== Former members ===
Image	Name	Years active	Instruments	Release contributions
	Criss Oliva	1978–1993 (until his death)	lead and rhythm guitar; backing vocals; bass (1991)	all releases from City Beneath the Surface EP (1983) to Edge of Thorns (1993); Ghost in the Ruins – A Tribute to Criss Oliva (1995)
	Steve "Doc" Wacholz	1978; 1979–1993	drums	all releases from City Beneath the Surface EP (1983) to Edge of Thorns (1993); Ghost in the Ruins – A Tribute to Criss Oliva (1995)
	Keith "Thumper" Collins	1981–1985	bass guitar; backing vocals	all releases from City Beneath the Surface EP (1983) to Power of the Night (1985)
	Alex Skolnick	1994	lead guitar	Handful of Rain (1994); Japan Live '94 (1995)

=== Touring musicians ===
Image	Name	Years active	Instruments	Release contributions
	John Zahner	1991–1992	keyboards; rhythm guitar; backing vocals	Zahner joined Savatage as touring keyboardist and guitarist following Chris Caffery's departure.
	Wes Garren	1993	keyboards; rhythm guitar; backing vocals	Garren took over from Zahner as sole keyboardist and appeared on several live videos.
	Andy James	1993	drums	James replaced Wacholz who decided not to tour.
	Damond Jiniya	2001–2002	lead vocals	Jiniya and Frost joined as touring replacements for Stevens and Pitrelli. Frost was fired to make way for the returning Pitrelli.
	Jack Frost	2001–2002	lead and rhythm guitar	Jiniya and Frost joined as touring replacements for Stevens and Pitrelli. Frost was fired to make way for the returning Pitrelli.
	Jeff Waters	2002	lead and rhythm guitar	Waters performed as co-lead guitarist on Savatage's 2002 Summer tour in place of Pitrelli who was unavailable.
	Bill Hudson	2015	lead and rhythm guitar	Hudson and Kuprij performed with the band at Wacken Open Air in 2015. Kuprij will also appear on the bands upcoming album Curtain Call (TBC)
	Vitalij Kuprij	2015 (died 2024)	keyboards	Hudson and Kuprij performed with the band at Wacken Open Air in 2015. Kuprij will also appear on the bands upcoming album Curtain Call (TBC)
	Paulo Cuevas	2025–present	keyboards; backing vocals	Cuevas and McNair joined as touring keyboardists for shows in 2025.
	Shawn McNair	2025–present	keyboards; backing vocals	Cuevas and McNair joined as touring keyboardists for shows in 2025.
	Blas Elias	2026	drums	Elias filled in for Jeff Plate on the first two shows of the Prelude To Madness tour.

== Session and guest musicians ==
Image	Name	Years active	Instruments	Release contributions
	Larry Dvoskin	1986	keyboards	Fight for the Rock (1986)
	Brent Daniels	1986	backing vocals	Fight for the Rock (1986)
	Paul O'Neill	1987–2002; 2014–2017 (his death)	producer; lyricist; co-composer; guitar; keyboards	all releases from Hall of the Mountain King (1987) to Poets and Madmen (2001)
	Ray Gillen	1987 (died 1993)	backing vocals	"Strange Wings" (1987); Hall of the Mountain King (1987)
	Robert Kinkel	1987–1991; 1995–2001	keyboards; backing vocals; engineering	Hall of the Mountain King (1987); Gutter Ballet (1989); Streets: A Rock Opera (1991); Dead Winter Dead (1995); The Wake of Magellan (1997); Poets and Madmen (2001)
	John Dittmar	1989	background shouts and laughs	Gutter Ballet (1989)
	Stephen Daggett	1989	background shouts and laughs	Gutter Ballet (1989)
	Jerry Van Deilen	1989	background shouts and laughs	Gutter Ballet (1989)
	Dan Campbell	1989	background shouts and laughs	Gutter Ballet (1989)
	Abi Reid	1991	female background vocals	Streets: A Rock Opera (1991)
	Mary Wooten	1995	cello	Dead Winter Dead (1995)
	John West	1999–2001	backing vocals	Poets and Madmen (2001)
	Jane Mangini	2023–2024	keyboards	Curtain Call (TBC)

== Avatar (pre-Savatage) members ==
Name	Years active	Instruments
Joe Conn	1978–1979	drums
Tony Ciulla	1978–1979	bass
Brian Belenon	1979	bass
Pat Dubs	1980 (died 2002)	rhythm guitar
Rich Bigano	1980	rhythm guitar
Andy Gmelin	1980	bass
Fritz	1980	bass
Bob Boyer	1980	vocals

== Line-ups ==
Period	Members	Studio releases
1978–1979	Jon Oliva – lead vocals, bass; Criss Oliva – guitars, backing vocals	
1980–1981	Jon Oliva – lead vocals, bass; Criss Oliva – guitars, backing vocals; Steve "Doc" Wacholz – drums	
1981–1985	Jon Oliva – lead vocals, keyboards; Criss Oliva – guitars, backing vocals; Steve "Doc" Wacholz – drums; Keith "Thumper" Collins – bass, backing vocals	City Beneath the Surface EP (1983); Sirens (1983); The Dungeons are Calling (1984); Power of the Night (1985)
1986–1987	Jon Oliva – lead vocals, keyboards; Criss Oliva – guitars, backing vocals; Steve "Doc" Wacholz – drums; Johnny Lee Middleton – bass, backing vocals	Fight for the Rock (1986); Hall of the Mountain King (1987)
1987–1990	Jon Oliva – lead vocals, keyboards; Criss Oliva – lead guitar, backing vocals; Steve "Doc" Wacholz – drums; Johnny Lee Middleton – bass, backing vocals; Chris Caffery – rhythm guitar, keyboards, backing vocals (touring 1987–1988)	Gutter Ballet (1989); Ghost in the Ruins – A Tribute to Criss Oliva (1995)
1990–1992	Jon Oliva – lead vocals, keyboards; Criss Oliva – guitars, backing vocals; Steve "Doc" Wacholz – drums; Johnny Lee Middleton – bass, backing vocals; John Zahner – keyboards, rhythm guitar, backing vocals (touring)	Streets: A Rock Opera (1991)
1992–1993	Criss Oliva – guitars, backing vocals; Steve "Doc" Wacholz – drums; Johnny Lee Middleton – bass, backing vocals; Zachary Stevens – lead vocals	Edge of Thorns (1993)
1993	Criss Oliva – guitars, backing vocals; Johnny Lee Middleton – bass, backing vocals; Zachary Stevens – lead vocals; Andy James – drums; Wes Garren – keyboards, rhythm guitar, backing vocals (touring)	none
1994–1995	Johnny Lee Middleton – bass, backing vocals (live only); Zachary Stevens – lead vocals; Jon Oliva – keyboards, rhythm guitar, vocals; Alex Skolnick – lead guitar; Jeff Plate – drums (live only)	Handful of Rain (1994); Japan Live '94 (1995)
1995–2000	Johnny Lee Middleton – bass, backing vocals; Zachary Stevens – lead vocals; Jon Oliva – keyboards, vocals; Jeff Plate – drums; Al Pitrelli – guitar, backing vocals; Chris Caffery – guitar, backing vocals	Dead Winter Dead (1995); The Wake of Magellan (1997)
2000–2001	Johnny Lee Middleton – bass, backing vocals; Jon Oliva – lead vocals, keyboards, rhythm guitar; Jeff Plate – drums; Chris Caffery – lead guitar, backing vocals	Poets and Madmen (2001)
2001–2002	Johnny Lee Middleton – bass, backing vocals; Jon Oliva – vocals, keyboards; Jeff Plate – drums; Chris Caffery – guitars, backing vocals; Damond Jiniya – lead vocals; Jack Frost – guitars	none
2002	Johnny Lee Middleton – bass, backing vocals; Jon Oliva – vocals, keyboards; Jeff Plate – drums; Chris Caffery – guitars, backing vocals; Damond Jiniya – lead vocals; Al Pitrelli – guitars, backing vocals; Jeff Waters – guitars, backing vocals (substitute for Pitreli July to August)	none
Band inactive 2002–2014
2014–2015	Johnny Lee Middleton – bass, backing vocals; Jon Oliva – keyboards, vocals; Jeff Plate – drums; Chris Caffery – guitars, backing vocals; Al Pitrelli – guitars, backing vocals; Zachary Stevens – lead vocals; Bill Hudson – guitars (touring); Vitalij Kuprij – keyboards (touring)	none – one show at Wacken Open Air
On hiatus 2015–2023
2023–present	Johnny Lee Middleton – bass, backing vocals; Jon Oliva – keyboards, vocals (not touring); Jeff Plate – drums; Chris Caffery – guitars, backing vocals; Al Pitrelli – guitars, backing vocals; Zachary Stevens – lead vocals; Paulo Cuevas – keyboards, backing vocals (touring); Shawn McNair – keyboards, backing vocals (touring)	Curtain Call (TBC)
