= Handful of Rain =

Studio album by Savatage
- Released: August 16, 1994
- Recorded: 1994
- Studio: Morrisound (Tampa)
- Genre: Heavy metal; progressive metal
- Length: 49:03
- Label: Atlantic (US and Canada); Bullet Proof/Intercord (Europe); Zero Corporation (Japan)
- Producer: Paul O'Neill, Jon Oliva

Savatage chronology
Edge of Thorns (1993)	Handful of Rain (1994)	Japan Live '94 (1995)

Handful of Rain is the eighth studio album by American heavy metal band Savatage, released in 1994. This is the first album since the death of the band's founding member and lead guitarist Criss Oliva, who had contributed to writing on its songs "Taunting Cobras" and "Nothing's Going On" before his death.

Handful of Rain is the band's only release with guitarist Alex Skolnick (who recorded leads), their only one without Johnny Lee Middleton since 1985's Power of the Night and their first without drummer Steve Wacholz. Wacholz had already left Savatage by the time the album was recorded. Both were credited and did promotional photos. Instead of replacing Middleton and Wacholz, Jon Oliva provided both drums and bass on the album as well as rhythm guitar, piano, keyboards, and backing vocals.

== Recording ==
Before the recording of the band's previous album, Edge of Thorns, Jon Oliva had temporarily left the band and stepped down as lead vocalist and was replaced on vocals by Zak Stevens. After the recording drummer and founding member Steve Wacholz left the band and was replaced by Andy James, who quit the band immediately after Criss Oliva's death and was also contacted by Zak Stevens and Jon Oliva about tracking drums for HOA but declined to do so. The band's original plan for the next album was to have Jon Oliva rejoin the band on keys and secondary vocals, along with former rhythm guitarist Chris Caffery at a later date, but this was shaken up due to the death of lead guitarist and founding member Criss Oliva at the end of 1993.

Jon Oliva and producer Paul O'Neill decided to keep Savatage going to honour the memory of Criss, and went to Morrisound Studios in Tampa, Florida, to work on the next album. They had invited Middleton, Stevens, Wacholz and Caffery to join them, but they were still dealing with the death of Criss and did not show up. Jon Oliva and O'Neill started writing and recording the album together, with Oliva performing all drums and bass on the album, with both he and O'Neill responsible for rhythm guitar and keyboards. Oliva also performed some lead guitar, but the pair eventually enlisted former Testament guitarist Alex Skolnick to record most of the guitar solos, and subsequently contacted vocalist Zak Stevens to record the vocal parts for the album.

The first album since the death of Criss Oliva, the music is often dark in reflection of brother Jon Oliva's loss. "Chance" is about Chiune Sugihara, a Japanese diplomat in Lithuania during World War II who defied government orders by signing exit visas for thousands of Jewish refugees. "Castles Burning" is about Giovanni Falcone, an Italian magistrate killed by the mafia in 1992. "Alone You Breathe" is a tribute to Criss which reuses the chord progression (albeit in a different key) and lyrics from the Streets song "Believe" in its long coda, and also part of the ending chorus in the Gutter Ballet song "When The Crowds Are Gone", although the lyrics do not mirror his death and the songs are not literally about him.

The album also marked the first time Savatage wrote a trademark vocal counterpoint in a song. The third section of "Chance" has at one point, five overdubbed vocals from singer Zak Stevens.

== Release and promotion ==
Although it was more a Jon Oliva solo effort, the album was released on August 16, 1994, as the eighth Savatage album. Oliva could not appear as a band member for contractual problems and so the sleeve and booklet included photos of both Wacholz and Middleton to maintain a more "classic" Savatage line-up feeling to the release. Wacholz is also in the video for the song "Handful of Rain". Jeff Plate, a former bandmate of Stevens, did not play the drums on the album, but was pictured as part of the band line-up in the European edition of the album. Plate would become a full-fledged member of the band by the time of their next release, Dead Winter Dead in 1995.

The title track was originally released as an abridged version, missing its second verse. Some editions of the album (for instance, the "Rock Masters" version released on the iTunes Store) include the omitted piece, referred to by the band and fans alike as "The Barmaid Verse".

The touring band consisted of Stevens on lead vocals and Middleton on bass guitar as the only remaining members of the line-up from the previous album. The tour also featured the official return of Jon Oliva to the band, who played keyboards, rhythm guitar and also performed vocals on several songs. The line-up was rounded out by lead guitarist Skolnick and Plate on drums.

The tour in support of Handful of Rain was documented in the live album Japan Live '94, which was released in 1995.

== Reception ==
Professional ratings
Review scores
Source	Rating
AllMusic	3/5 stars
Collector's Guide to Heavy Metal	5/10
Metal Hammer (Germany)	7/7
Rock Hard	8.0/10

In a contemporary review for Rock Hard magazine, Matthias Breusch was disappointed for not being able to elect Handful of Rain among the best records of the month, like he did with Edge of Thorns. Despite sounding like a true Savatage album and a natural progression from previous works, he found the album lacking "catchy tunes" and "uptempo anthems", with the best tracks being slower songs and ballads exalted by Skolnick's guitar work.

Modern reviews are mixed. Alex Henderson of AllMusic considered Handful of Rain an excellent album "that is melodic, ambitious, often operatic and consistently absorbing" and the band "impressively consistent", even after the personnel changes caused by Criss Oliva's death. Martin Popoff instead wrote that the album was "upsetting and confusing" for older fans, confirming the band's "fascination for power pomp, accomplished, progressive light/heavy balladry", with less focus on fast heavy metal.

== Track listing ==
No.	Title	Writer(s)	Length
1.	"Taunting Cobras"	Jon Oliva, Paul O'Neill, Criss Oliva	3:21
2.	"Handful of Rain"	J. Oliva, O'Neill	5:01
3.	"Chance"	J. Oliva, O'Neill	7:50
4.	"Stare into the Sun"	J. Oliva, O'Neill	4:43
5.	"Castles Burning"	J. Oliva, O'Neill	4:39
6.	"Visions" (instrumental)	J. Oliva, O'Neill	1:25
7.	"Watching You Fall"	J. Oliva, O'Neill	5:20
8.	"Nothing's Going On"	J. Oliva, O'Neill, C. Oliva	4:09
9.	"Symmetry"	J. Oliva, O'Neill	5:04
10.	"Alone You Breathe"	J. Oliva, O'Neill	7:30

2002 SPV CD reissue bonus tracks
No.	Title	Writer(s)	Length
11.	"Chance" (Radio Edit)	J. Oliva, O'Neill	4:50
12.	"Alone You Breathe" (acoustic version, also bonus track on 1997 Edel Music CD reissue)	J. Oliva, O'Neill	4:38

2011 EarMusic CD reissue bonus tracks
No.	Title	Writer(s)	Length
11.	"Summer's Rain" (acoustic version)	C. Oliva, J. Oliva, O'Neill	5:29
12.	"Believe" (acoustic version)	J. Oliva, O'Neill, C. Oliva	3:52

== Personnel ==
=== Credited line-up ===
- Zachary Stevens - vocals
- Alex Skolnick - guitar
- Johnny Lee Middleton - bass
- Steve Wacholz - drums

=== Actual line-up ===
- Jon Oliva - drums, bass guitar, rhythm and lead guitar, piano, keyboards, backing vocals, co-producer, co-lyricist
- Paul O'Neill - rhythm guitar, keyboards, producer, lyricist
- Zachary Stevens - lead and backing vocals
- Alex Skolnick - lead guitar

=== Touring line-up ===
- Zachary Stevens - lead vocals
- Jon Oliva - keyboards, rhythm guitar, vocals
- Alex Skolnick - lead guitar
- Johnny Lee Middleton - bass
- Jeff Plate - drums

=== Production ===
- Paul O'Neill - producer
- Jim Morris - engineer
- Judd Packer, Mark Prator, Tom Morris - additional engineering
- Brian Benscoter, Dave Wehner, Jeff MacDonald, Steve Heritage - assistant engineers
- Howard Helm - keyboards engineer
- Bob Kinkle - pre-production engineer
- Andy van Dette - mastering at Masterdisk, New York

== Charts ==
Year	Chart	Position
1994	Billboard Heatseekers Albums (US)	31
1994	Japanese Albums Chart	66
1994	German Albums Chart	85

2022 chart performance for Handful of Rain
Chart (2022)	Peak position
German Albums (Offizielle Top 100)	20
