= Edge of Thorns (song) =

Single by Savatage

from the album Edge of Thorns
- B-side: "Forever After"
- Released: March 16, 1993
- Genre: Progressive metal
- Length: 5:54
- Label: Atlantic
- Songwriter(s): Criss Oliva; Jon Oliva; Paul O'Neill
- Producer(s): Paul O'Neill; Jon Oliva; Criss Oliva

Savatage singles chronology
| "Sammy and Tex" (1991) | "Edge of Thorns" (1993) | "He Carves His Stones" (1993) |

"Edge of Thorns" is a song by American progressive metal band Savatage. The song was released as the promo lead single from the band's seventh album Edge of Thorns. The single is Savatage's first song to feature new vocalist Zachary Stevens.

"Edge of Thorns" is Savatage's only charting single in America, peaking at #26 on the Mainstream Rock chart.

== About ==
As with the rest of the album, drummer Steve "Doc" Wacholz recorded the song using electronic drums.

The song's opening piano riff was extensively used in the 1994 MTV reality show The Real World: San Francisco in scenes involving Pedro Zamora's hospitalization.

== Music video ==
The song's music video takes place in a jungle and cuts back and forth between shots of wildlife and the band performing the song.

== Track listing ==
| No. | Title | Length |
|---|---|---|
| 1. | "Edge of Thorns" (LP version) | 5:55 |
| 2. | "Edge of Thorns" (radio edit) | 5:20 |
| 3. | "Forever After" | 4:18 |

== Personnel ==
Savatage

- Zachary Stevens – vocals
- Criss Oliva – guitars
- Johnny Lee Middleton – bass guitar
- Steve "Doc" Wacholz – drums

Additional musicians

- Jon Oliva – piano, keyboards
