= Streets: A Rock Opera =

Studio album by Savatage
- Released: October 15, 1991
- Recorded: January–July 1991
- Studio: 321 Studios in New York City
- Genres: Heavy metal, progressive metal, rock opera
- Length: 68:33
- Label: Atlantic
- Producer: Paul O'Neill

Savatage chronology
| Gutter Ballet (1990) | Streets: A Rock Opera (1991) | Edge of Thorns (1993) |

Alternative cover
- Narrated version of the album

Streets: A Rock Opera (often simply shortened to Streets) is the sixth studio album by the American heavy metal band Savatage and is a rock opera dealing with the rise and fall of the fictional musician DT Jesus. It was originally released in October 1991 on Atlantic Records. The album took almost a year to record, with pre-production beginning in October 1990. It was also Jon Oliva's last album as lead vocalist until 1995's Dead Winter Dead and 1997's The Wake of Magellan, where he shared lead vocal duties with Zak Stevens (singing lead on two songs from each album). He resumed lead vocal duties exclusively on 2001's Poets and Madmen.

== Story and concept ==
The story features a fallen rock star called DT Jesus (DT is short for either De-Tox or Down-Town), who has hit hard times. He is a drug dealer as the story begins and just another lowlife on the streets of New York City. Streets recounts the story behind DT Jesus and his rise to fame again and his second fall.

The concept of Streets is based on a book written by Paul O'Neill in 1979 as a Broadway play and stored in a drawer at O'Neill's home until guitarist Criss Oliva found it and suggested it be Savatage's next album. It was never meant to be an autobiography and it is considered coincidental that the life of lead vocalist Jon Oliva mirrored that of the main character DT Jesus at the time.

== Production ==
Savatage had thought about writing a rock opera after their successful collaboration with O'Neill in recording Hall of the Mountain King. During the recording of its follow-up in 1989, Criss Oliva found a play and accompanying music written by O'Neill, which the band intended to use on their album. Soon after, however, the band felt they were not ready yet, and postponed the idea for their next record. The record they were working on still received the name of the play, Gutter Ballet, and the song from the play "When the Crowds Are Gone" was recorded for the album. The band then decided that their next album would be based on the play and started pre-production in October 1990, entering the studio to record what would become Streets at the beginning of 1991.

After the tour supporting Gutter Ballet however, rhythm guitarist Chris Caffery left Savatage on friendly terms to rejoin his brother's band, where he could play lead guitar instead of rhythm guitar. He would later rejoin Savatage in 1995 for the recording of Dead Winter Dead and has remained a member ever since.

Songs like "Jesus Saves" and "Ghost in the Ruins" were "rocked up", said O'Neill, while many others, including "Believe", "Heal My Soul" (which is based on a traditional Welsh lullaby, "Suo Gân"), and "A Little Too Far", all appear in the same version intended for their Broadway performances. Other tracks like "Streets" and "Strange Reality" were written expressly for the rock opera. Originally the album would contain more spoken tracks than the one used for the introduction for "Jesus Saves". This track was a reworking of the song "DT Jesus" after Atlantic Records executives did not like the original version, and was recorded along with "Can You Hear Me Now" with only Jon and Criss Oliva in the studio.

=== Outtakes ===
The album was originally due to be a double CD record, but late in the recording process Savatage decided to compress the story into one album. The band recorded close to 50 songs and then reduced them to 19. Jon Oliva and O'Neill have since stated that they would have liked to release it as a double album later on, but record label Atlantic Records lost reels of the sessions in their vaults. These "lost tracks" were re-written over the years and eventually formed parts of songs on Edge of Thorns and later works. The double CD that the band originally intended will never see the light of day, partly because the only recordings that remain are on audio cassette from the master tapes. Additionally, most of the original song ideas were used in later works. Here is a list of discarded tracks from the Streets recording sessions:

- "Larry Elbows"
- "Beyond Broadway"
- "Up to You"
- "Life Goes On"
- "Stay"
- "Desirée"
- "Tonight I Would be King"
- "Island of the Kings"
- "Sanctuary"

Among the songs that were dropped was also "DT Jesus", later reworked into "Jesus Saves", a song which was later released on the 2013 director's cut version of the album, and also available on the From the Gutter to the Stage compilation.

"Larry Elbows" (referred to by some as "the 17th track"), which was included in the 2013 reissue, is based on an old demo by the band, "Stranger in the Dark" (of which other parts would be used for "This Is Where You Should Be") from the Silver Edition of The Dungeons are Calling. The track was also used as basis for the Edge of Thorns song "Follow Me".

"Beyond Broadway", another track written for the album, was also reworked by Jon Oliva and parts of the song formed "Lies" on the Jon Oliva's Pain's album Festival.

"Stay" involves the character of Duke, who is also featured in the story of "When the Crowds Are Gone" off Gutter Ballet, and was supposed to follow on from "Ghost in the Ruins". It appears on the 1997 re-release of Hall of the Mountain King, also in an acoustic arrangement. The remake of the song appeared on the sixth studio album Letters from the Labyrinth by the Trans-Siberian Orchestra.

"Desirée" was later released on the 1997 Edel re-release of the album as an acoustic version sung by Zak Stevens.

A demo of "Island of the Kings" has surfaced on the internet and showcases how the band drew inspiration from The Beatles, as was often stated by Jon Oliva.

"Sanctuary" was a new version of the Gutter Ballet outtake "Target", the latter later being released on the 2002 Silver Anniversary edition of Sirens.

== Release ==
The band originally wanted to call the record Gutter Ballet, which was the title of the play written by O'Neill. However, the inclusion of that song on their previous record made it impossible. In later interviews, they stated that Ghost in the Ruins would have been a better title. O'Neill said that "Streets was OK too," but Jon Oliva disliked the fact that A Rock Opera was tagged onto the title. In fact, when performing the album live, Oliva has only introduced the album as Streets. An album entitled Ghost in the Ruins was later released in 1995, as a tribute to Criss Oliva.

On September 27, 2013, EarMusic Records released a 31-track narrated version of the album, which also includes the previously unreleased song "Larry Elbows" and the original version of "Jesus Saves", making it the most complete version available.

The band recorded a music video for the song "Jesus Saves" which received some airplay on MTV. It featured long-time Savatage cover artist Gary Smith playing the role of DT Jesus. A video was filmed for "New York City Don't Mean Nothing", but that video has been "lost." As of 2015, it has never been aired.

"Heal My Soul" was re-recorded by Savatage's offshoot musical project, the Trans-Siberian Orchestra, on a 2007 Wal-Mart CD sampler. "Believe" was re-recorded with Tim Hockenberry on vocals by the Trans-Siberian Orchestra on their 2009 album Night Castle.

During their 2007 tour, Jon Oliva's Pain performed some of the album in its original running order, as a special surprise for audiences. Oliva himself noted on stage that some of the songs had never been performed in front of a live audience.

Jon Oliva's Pain performed the album in its entirety at the 2014 edition of the ProgPower USA festival in Atlanta, GA.

== Critical reception ==
Professional ratings
Review scores
| Source | Rating |
|---|---|
| AllMusic | 4.5/5 stars |
| Collector's Guide to Heavy Metal | 7/10 |
| Metal Hammer (GER) | 7/7 |
| Rock Hard | 9.5/10 |

In 2005, Streets: A Rock Opera was ranked number 310 in Rock Hard magazine's book The 500 Greatest Rock & Metal Albums of All Time.

== Track listings ==
All music composed by Paul O'Neill, Jon Oliva and Criss Oliva. All lyrics written by Paul O'Neill and Jon Oliva, based on a book written by Paul O'Neill.

| No. | Title | Length |
|---|---|---|
| 1. | "Streets" | 6:48 |
| 2. | "Jesus Saves" | 5:13 |
| 3. | "Tonight He Grins Again" | 3:28 |
| 4. | "Strange Reality" | 4:56 |
| 5. | "A Little Too Far" | 3:25 |
| 6. | "You're Alive" | 1:51 |
| 7. | "Sammy and Tex" | 3:07 |
| 8. | "St. Patrick's" | 4:17 |
| 9. | "Can You Hear Me Now" | 5:11 |
| 10. | "New York City Don't Mean Nothing" | 4:01 |
| 11. | "Ghost in the Ruins" | 5:32 |
| 12. | "If I Go Away" | 5:17 |
| 13. | "Agony and Ecstasy" | 3:33 |
| 14. | "Heal My Soul" | 2:35 |
| 15. | "Somewhere in Time" | 3:17 |
| 16. | "Believe" | 5:42 |

Original LP release
| No. | Title | Length |
|---|---|---|
| 1. | "Streets" | 6:48 |
| 2. | "Jesus Saves" | 5:13 |
| 3. | "Tonight He Grins Again" | 3:28 |
| 4. | "Strange Reality" | 4:56 |
| 5. | "A Little Too Far" | 3:25 |
| 6. | "You're Alive" | 1:51 |
| 7. | "Sammy and Tex" | 3:07 |
| 8. | "Can You Hear Me Now" | 5:11 |
| 9. | "New York City Don't Mean Nothing" | 4:01 |
| 10. | "Ghost in the Ruins" | 5:32 |
| 11. | "Agony and Ecstasy" | 3:33 |
| 12. | "Heal My Soul" | 2:35 |
| 13. | "Somewhere in Time" | 3:17 |
| 14. | "Believe" | 5:42 |

1997 Edel Music CD reissue
| No. | Title | Length |
|---|---|---|
| 17. | "Desirée" | 3:54 |

2002 SPV CD reissue
| No. | Title | Length |
|---|---|---|
| 1. | "Streets" | 6:48 |
| 2. | "Jesus Saves" | 5:27 |
| 3. | "Tonight He Grins Again / Strange Reality" | 8:02 |
| 4. | "A Little Too Far" | 3:34 |
| 5. | "You're Alive / Sammy and Tex" | 4:58 |
| 6. | "St. Patrick's" | 4:29 |
| 7. | "Can You Hear Me Now" | 5:11 |
| 8. | "New York City Don't Mean Nothing" | 4:03 |
| 9. | "Ghost in the Ruins" | 5:31 |
| 10. | "If I Go Away" | 5:17 |
| 11. | "Agony and Ecstasy / Heal My Soul" | 6:11 |
| 12. | "Somewhere in Time / Believe" | 9:02 |
| 13. | "Ghost in the Ruins" (Live in the Netherlands 06/10/93 - incorrectly listed as "live", instead being the studio version) | 5:20 |
| 14. | "Jesus Saves" (incorrectly listed as "live", instead being a shorter studio version) | 3:21 |

2011 EarMusic CD reissue bonus tracks
| No. | Title | Length |
|---|---|---|
| 17. | "This Isn't What We Meant" (acoustic version) | 5:30 |
| 18. | "Morning Sun" (acoustic version) | 4:41 |

"Streets: A Rock Opera - Narrated Version" 2013 EarMusic director's cut
| No. | Title | Length |
|---|---|---|
| 1. | "Streets" | 6:48 |
| 2. | "Narration to "Jesus"" | 1:05 |
| 3. | "Jesus Saves" (original version, previously titled "DT Jesus" and released as a bonus track) | 4:49 |
| 4. | "Narration to "Tonight He Grins Again"" | 0:18 |
| 5. | "Tonight He Grins Again" | 3:26 |
| 6. | "Narration to "Strange Reality"" | 0:35 |
| 7. | "Strange Reality" | 4:54 |
| 8. | "Narration to "A Little Too Far"" | 0:16 |
| 9. | "A Little Too Far" | 3:23 |
| 10. | "Narration to "You're Alive"" | 0:25 |
| 11. | "You're Alive" | 1:51 |
| 12. | "Narration to "Sammy and Tex"" | 0:17 |
| 13. | "Sammy and Tex" | 3:06 |
| 14. | "Narration to "St. Patrick's"" | 0:42 |
| 15. | "St. Patrick's" | 4:15 |
| 16. | "Narration to "Can You Hear Me Now"" | 0:30 |
| 17. | "Can You Hear Me Now" | 5:09 |
| 18. | "Narration to "New York City Don't Mean Nothing"" | 0:57 |
| 19. | "New York City Don't Mean Nothing" | 3:59 |
| 20. | "Narration to "Ghost in the Ruins"" | 0:21 |
| 21. | "Ghost in the Ruins" | 5:29 |
| 22. | "Narration to "If I Go Away"" | 0:15 |
| 23. | "If I Go Away" | 5:15 |
| 24. | "Narration to "Agony and Ecstasy"" | 0:22 |
| 25. | "Agony and Ecstasy" | 3:32 |
| 26. | "Narration to "Heal My Soul"" | 2:03 |
| 27. | "Heal My Soul" | 2:33 |
| 28. | "Narration to "Somewhere in Time"" | 0:37 |
| 29. | "Somewhere in Time" | 3:15 |
| 30. | "Believe" | 5:41 |
| 31. | "Larry Elbows" (previously unreleased) | 4:09 |

== Personnel ==
Savatage

- Jon Oliva – vocals, piano, keyboard, drums on "Jesus Saves" and "Can You Hear me Now"
- Criss Oliva – guitar, backing vocals, bass on "Jesus Saves" and "Can You Hear me Now"
- Johnny Lee Middleton – bass, backing vocals
- Steve "Doc" Wacholz – drums

Additional musicians

- Robert Kinkel – keyboards, Children's Choir conductor
- Children's Choir – intro (Mozart's Magic Flute) and background vocals on "Streets"
- Elena Doria – Children's Choir director
- Abi Reid – female background vocals
- John Zahner – keyboards, rhythm guitar, backing vocals (touring member)

Production

- Paul O'Neill – producer
- John Kayne, James A. Ball – engineers
- Scott Burns, Judd Packer, Noah Baron, Tim Hatfield – additional engineering
- Joe Daley, Scott Pizzo, J'Kael Trstram, Jay DeVito – assistant engineers
- Greg Calbi – mastering at Sterling Sound, New York
- Chris Fountain, Kurt Johnson – technical assistants
- Bob Defrin – cover design
- Tory Chartier – cover development
- William Hames – photography
- Gary Smith – back cover illustration

== Charts ==
| Year | Chart | Position |
|---|---|---|
| 1991 | Billboard Heatseekers Albums (US) | 31 |

2022 chart performance for "Streets: A Rock Opera"
| Chart (2022) | Peak position |
|---|---|
| German Albums (Offizielle Top 100) | 9 |
