= Edge of Thorns =

Studio album by Savatage
- Released: April 6, 1993
- Recorded: 1992–1993
- Studios: Morrisound Recording (Tampa, Florida); 321 Studios (New York City)
- Genres: Heavy metal, power metal
- Length: 59:54
- Label: Atlantic
- Producers: Paul O'Neill, Jon Oliva, Criss Oliva

Savatage chronology
Streets: A Rock Opera (1991)	Edge of Thorns (1993)	Handful of Rain (1994)

Edge of Thorns is the seventh studio album by the American heavy metal band Savatage, released on April 6, 1993, by Atlantic Records. It was the last Savatage album to feature guitarist Criss Oliva, who died six months after its release, and their first release with Zachary Stevens on lead vocals, following the departure of Jon Oliva from his role as singer in Savatage, although he did produce and write songs for the album.

The drums on this album sound different from other Savatage records, as Steve "Doc" Wacholz decided to use electronic drums. Although most of the drum kits sound authentic, a difference in the timbre of the toms can be heard.

"All That I Bleed" and "Miles Away" were the last songs Jon Oliva, Criss Oliva and the producer Paul O'Neill wrote together. For that, they are still Jon Oliva's two favorites on the album.

The woman in the picture of the album art is Dawn Oliva, Criss Oliva's wife. Gary Smith, who also did the front and back covers for Hall of the Mountain King, the front cover for Gutter Ballet, the back cover for Streets, and all of Criss Oliva's airbrushed guitars, painted the cover. The face in the trees is supposed to be Jon Oliva, though producer O'Neill disputes that despite its publication in a Criss Oliva interview from 1993. The cover is supposed to represent good (the woman) vs. evil (the face in the trees). According to Criss Oliva in a 1993 interview, "The girl is surrounded by fear and innocence. But the face in the trees is evil. Everything around her is evil. It's about good and evil. The songs on the CD reflect this, too."

The opening piano riff to the title track was used extensively in the MTV reality series The Real World: San Francisco during scenes involving the hospitalization of Pedro Zamora.

== Reception ==
Professional ratings
Review scores
Source	Rating
AllMusic	4/5 stars
Collector's Guide to Heavy Metal	7/10
Metal Hammer (GER)	7/7
Rock Hard	9.5/10

In a contemporary review for Rock Hard magazine, where Edge of Thorns had been elected Album of the Month, Matthias Breusch wrote that Savatage had "not lost a pinch of their compositional potential and energy" and praised Criss Oliva's guitar playing; he complimented new singer Zak Stevens' "powerful, energetic voice", which was "cleverly adapted to the melodic lines" of the new songs, although he missed Jon Oliva's "crazy screams".

Modern reviews are generally positive. AllMusic Geoff Orens praised Savatage's continuous experimentation of new sounds and wrote that Edge of Thorns moved away from the progressive metal of the two previous albums, being a "leaner, more understated guitar-driven record", with the majority of the songs consisting "of stripped-down metal anthems, recorded with less flashy guitar work and production" than before. In his opinion, the new material fits well the "less bombastic delivery" of new singer Stevens, who does "not have the emotional range that Oliva showed on Gutter Ballet and Streets". Canadian journalist Martin Popoff remarked how Edge of Thorns was "a raucous return to old Savatage vein", with "mountains of thirsty power riffs" and "an odd adherence to a goth past", mostly out of fashion in the alternative metal scene of the time. He was more critical of "the band's mellow tendencies" and the murky long intros to the songs.

== Track listing ==
All music composed by Criss Oliva, Jon Oliva and Paul O'Neill. All lyrics written by Paul O'Neill and Jon Oliva.

No.	Title	Length
1.	"Edge of Thorns"	5:54
2.	"He Carves His Stone"	4:14
3.	"Lights Out"	3:10
4.	"Skraggy's Tomb"	4:22
5.	"Labyrinths" (instrumental)	1:29
6.	"Follow Me"	5:08
7.	"Exit Music" (instrumental)	3:05
8.	"Degrees of Sanity"	4:36
9.	"Conversation Piece"	4:10
10.	"All That I Bleed"	4:41
11.	"Damien"	3:53
12.	"Miles Away"	5:06
13.	"Sleep"	3:52

Original Japanese bonus tracks
No.	Title	Length
14.	"Forever After"	4:20
15.	"Shotgun Innocence"	3:30

1997 Edel Music CD reissue
No.	Title	Length
14.	"Believe" (Acoustic version)	3:52

2002 SPV CD reissue
No.	Title	Length
14.	"Forever After"	4:18
15.	"Conversation Piece" (Rehearsal 9/24/94)	4:19

2010 EarMusic CD reissue bonus tracks
No.	Title	Length
14.	"All That I Bleed" (Acoustic version)	4:34
15.	"If I Go Away" (Acoustic version)	3:49

== Personnel ==
Savatage

- Zachary Stevens – lead vocals
- Criss Oliva – guitars, co-producer
- Johnny Lee Middleton – bass
- Steve "Doc" Wacholz – drums (electronic drums, studio only)

Additional musicians

- Jon Oliva – piano, keyboards, drums on tracks "He Carves His Stone" and "Degrees of Sanity" (studio only), co-producer
- Andy James – drums (touring member only)
- Wes Garren – rhythm guitar and keyboards (touring member only)

Production

- Paul O'Neill – producer
- Jim Morris, Tom Morris – engineers at Morrisound Studios
- Joe Daley, Mark Prator – assistant engineers at Morrisound Studios
- Scott Burns, Judd Packer, Noah Baron, Tim Hatfield – additional engineering in New York
- Brian Benscoter, Brian Malone, Claire Iwahashi, Dave Wehner, Jeff McDonald, Joe Davi, Martin Yee, Rick Miller, Shawn Malone, Steve Heritage – assistant engineers in New York
- Greg Calbi – mastering at Sterling Sound, New York

== Charts ==
=== Album ===
Year	Chart	Position
1993	Billboard Heatseekers Albums (US)	23
1993	Japanese Albums Chart	52
1993	German Albums Chart	79
2010	Greek Albums Chart	28

2022 chart performance for Edge of Thorns
Chart (2022)	Peak position
German Albums (Offizielle Top 100)	15

=== Songs ===
Year	Single	Chart	Position
1993	"Edge of Thorns"	Mainstream Rock Tracks (US)	26
