= Power of the Night =

Studio album by Savatage
- Released: April 15, 1985
- Studios: Bearsville (Bearsville, New York)
- Genres: Heavy metal, power metal
- Length: 38:43
- Label: Atlantic
- Producer: Max Norman

Savatage chronology
The Dungeons Are Calling (1984)	Power of the Night (1985)	Fight for the Rock (1986)

Singles from Power of the Night
- 1. "Hard for Love" Released: 1985; 2. "In the Dream" Released: 1985

Professional ratings
Review scores
Source	Rating
AllMusic	2.5/5 stars
Collector's Guide to Heavy Metal	10/10
Metal.de	6/10

Power of the Night is the second studio album by the American heavy metal band Savatage, released in 1985. This record was produced by Max Norman, who later went on to produce Megadeth's 1992 hit album Countdown to Extinction.

The record was not originally pressed with a Parental Advisory sticker on the cover. However, Atlantic Records did have a problem with some of the sexual metaphors mentioned in "Hard for Love" and "Skull Session." It was also a marketing ploy to encourage more people to buy the record as a result of it being "banned" by some outlets.

This was bassist Keith Collins's last album with the band. Jon and Criss Oliva were not completely happy with Collins' playing and corrected some of his mistakes for the final version. Collins was replaced by Johnny Lee Middleton in 1986.

== Track listing ==
Side one
No.	Title	Lyrics	Music	Length
1.	"Power of the Night"	Jon Oliva	Criss Oliva	5:13
2.	"Unusual"	J. Oliva, Keith Collins	C. Oliva, J. Oliva, Collins	4:27
3.	"Warriors"	J. Oliva, Collins	C. Oliva, J. Oliva, Collins	4:03
4.	"Necrophilia"	J. Oliva, Collins	C. Oliva	3:36
5.	"Washed Out"	J. Oliva	C. Oliva, J. Oliva	2:13

Side two
No.	Title	Lyrics	Music	Length
6.	"Hard for Love"	J. Oliva, Collins	J. Oliva, C. Oliva	3:59
7.	"Fountain of Youth"	J. Oliva, Collins, Steve Wacholz	C. Oliva	4:31
8.	"Skull Session"	J. Oliva	C. Oliva, J. Oliva	3:21
9.	"Stuck on You"	J. Oliva	C. Oliva, Collins	3:10
10.	"In the Dream"	J. Oliva	C. Oliva, J. Oliva	4:15

1997 Edel Music CD reissue bonus tracks
No.	Title	Writer(s)	Length
11.	"Sleep" (Piano version)	C. Oliva, J. Oliva, Paul O'Neill	4:16

2002 SPV CD reissue bonus tracks
No.	Title	Writer(s)	Length
11.	"Power of the Night" (live)	J. Oliva	3:45
12.	"Sirens" (live)	C. Oliva, J. Oliva	3:02

2011 EarMusic reissue bonus tracks
No.	Title	Writer(s)	Length
11.	"City Beneath the Surface" (live)	J. Oliva, C. Oliva	5:01
12.	"Hounds" (live)	C. Oliva, J. Oliva	7:20

== Personnel ==
Savatage

- Jon Oliva – vocals, keyboards
- Criss Oliva – guitars
- Keith Collins – bass
- Steve Wacholz – drums

Production

- Max Norman – producer, engineer
- Ken Lonas – assistant engineer
- Bob Defrin – art direction

== Charts ==
Chart performance for Power of the Night
Chart (2021)	Peak position
German Albums (Offizielle Top 100)	61
