= Fight for the Rock =

Studio album by Savatage
- Released: June 30, 1986
- Genres: Heavy metal, hard rock
- Length: 37:54
- Label: Atlantic
- Producer: Stephan Galfas

Savatage chronology
Power of the Night (1985)	Fight for the Rock (1986)	Hall of the Mountain King (1987)

Professional ratings
Review scores
Source	Rating
AllMusic	1.5/5 stars
Collector's Guide to Heavy Metal	7/10
Kerrang!	3/5 stars
Metal Hammer (GER)	5/7
Rock Hard	7.0/10

Fight for the Rock is the third studio album by the American heavy metal band Savatage, released on June 30, 1986. It is their first album with new bass player Johnny Lee Middleton.

Released in 1986, it is largely regarded as the band's worst release by both fans and band members, with the band referring to it as "Fight for the Nightmare". Jon Oliva said in October 1994, "I've never really been fond of that album. WE'VE never been fond of that album". The band said that they were driven to make the record by their label, Atlantic Records; particularly Oliva began writing pop-rock songs for other artists on the label such as John Waite. However, the label eventually turned around and told the band to record the music that Oliva had written for other artists themselves. This destroyed the band's credibility in the eyes of the press, and their reviews were not kind. The negative critical reaction has also been cited as the cause of Oliva's battle with drug and alcohol addiction, which eventually drove him from the fore of the band.

Atlantic Records also wanted the band to have photographs taken, since none of their previous releases had included any. The band hired a friend to do the photography work, with one of the photos featuring the band re-recreating the famous photo Raising the Flag on Iwo Jima. The band agreed this was a good idea at the time, but look back with the same feelings on the photos taken as they do the album.

When initially released, the album featured a Parental Advisory label on the front cover, despite having no "nasty words", as Jon Oliva puts it, featured anywhere on the record. This was largely done to please the label, as they felt that putting the sticker on the record would drive up record sales. Although it did chart, the band have been extremely reluctant to perform any of the songs live, and haven't done so since the early 1990s. Even on the tour in support of the album, the band only performed "Hyde", "The Edge of Midnight" and few others.

== Track listing ==
Side one
No.	Title	Writer(s)	Length
1.	"Fight for the Rock"	Criss Oliva, Jon Oliva, Steve Wacholz	3:55
2.	"Out on the Streets"	C. Oliva, J. Oliva	3:58
3.	"Crying for Love"	C. Oliva, J. Oliva	3:27
4.	"Day After Day" (Badfinger cover)	Pete Ham	3:40
5.	"The Edge of Midnight"	C. Oliva, J. Oliva, Wacholz	4:52

Side two
No.	Title	Writer(s)	Length
6.	"Hyde"	C. Oliva, J. Oliva, Wacholz	3:51
7.	"Lady in Disguise"	J. Oliva	3:08
8.	"She's Only Rock 'n Roll"	C. Oliva, J. Oliva	3:14
9.	"Wishing Well" (Free cover)	John "Rabbit" Bundrick, Paul Kossoff, Simon Kirke, Paul Rodgers, Tetsu Yamauchi	3:20
10.	"Red Light Paradise"	Johnny Lee Middleton, C. Oliva, J. Oliva	3:56

1997 Edel Music CD reissue
No.	Title	Writer(s)	Length
11.	"If I Go Away" (Acoustic version)	C. Oliva, J. Oliva, Paul O'Neill	3:50

2002 SPV CD reissue
No.	Title	Writer(s)	Length
11.	"The Dungeons Are Calling" (live)	Keith Collins, C. Oliva, J. Oliva	3:45
12.	"City Beneath the Surface" (live)	C. Oliva, J. Oliva	5:01

2011 Ear Music CD reissue
No.	Title	Writer(s)	Length
11.	"This Is the Time" (acoustic version recorded by Jon Oliva in 2010)	O'Neill, J. Oliva	5:31
12.	"This Is Where You Should Be" (recorded during the Hall of the Mountain King sessions)	O'Neill, J. Oliva	4:55

== Personnel ==
Savatage

- Jon Oliva – lead vocals, piano
- Criss Oliva – guitars, backing vocals
- Johnny Lee Middleton – bass, backing vocals
- Steve "Doc" Wacholz – drums, percussion

Additional musicians

- Larry Dvoskin (credited as "Dvoskin") – keyboards
- Brent Daniels – backing vocals

Production

- Stephan Galfas – producer, engineer, mixing
- Mario Rodriguez, Ralph Mastrangelo – assistant mixing
- Mark Jolley – engineer
- Dan McMillan – assistant engineer
- Bob Ludwig – mastering at Masterdisk, New York
- Robert Zemsky – associate producer, management
- Steven Machat, Rick Smith – executive producers
- Bob Defrin – art direction

== Charts ==
Chart performance for Fight for the Rock
Chart (1986)	Peak position
US Billboard 200	158

Chart (2021)	Peak position
German Albums (Offizielle Top 100)	67
