= Savatage =

American heavy metal band

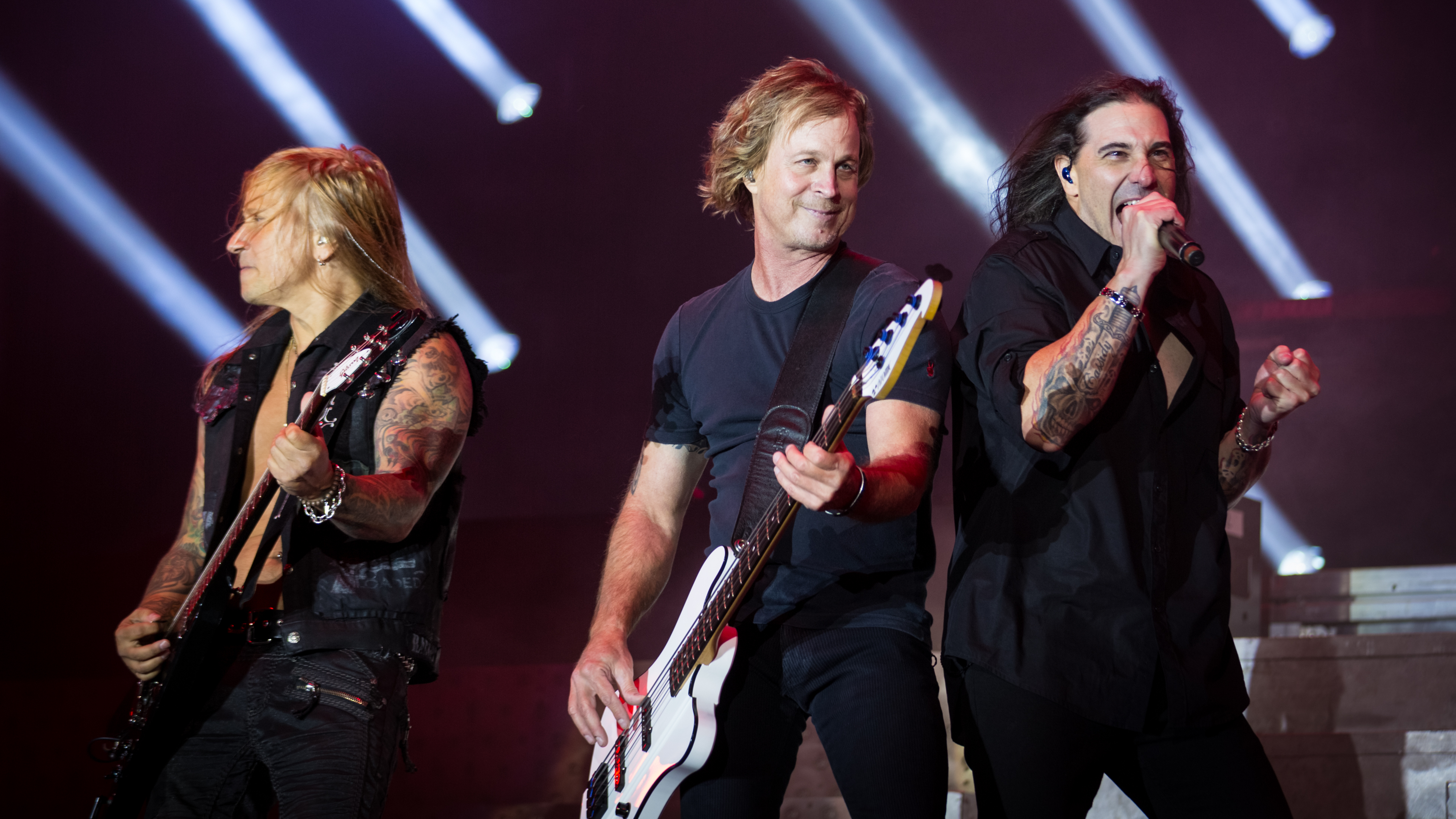
- Savatage at Wacken Open Air 2015

Background information
- Also known as: Avatar (1979–1983)
- Origin: Tarpon Springs, Florida, U.S.
- Genres: Heavy metal; progressive metal; power metal
- Works: Discography
- Years active: 1979–2002; 2014–2015; 2023–present
- Labels: Par Records; Combat; Atlantic; Nuclear Blast; SPV/Steamhammer
- Spinoffs: Trans-Siberian Orchestra; Circle II Circle; Jon Oliva's Pain; Doctor Butcher
- Members: Jon Oliva; Johnny Lee Middleton; Chris Caffery; Zachary Stevens; Jeff Plate; Al Pitrelli
- Past members: See: List of Savatage band members
- Website: savatage.com

Savatage (/ˈsævətɑːʒ/) is an American heavy metal band founded by brothers Jon and Criss Oliva in 1979 in Tarpon Springs, Florida. The band was first called Avatar, but, shortly before the release of their debut album Sirens (1983), they changed their name to Savatage, as Avatar was already taken by at least one other band. Savatage is considered to be an integral part of the American heavy metal movement of the early-to-mid-1980s and has been cited as a key influence on numerous metal genres. The band has released eleven studio albums, three live albums, five compilations and three EPs.

For their fourth album Hall of the Mountain King (1987), Savatage teamed up with producer and songwriter Paul O'Neill. This new partnership earned the band significant critical acclaim, and O'Neill would work with Savatage on all their future albums until his death in 2017. The band's success continued with the albums Gutter Ballet (1990) and Streets: A Rock Opera (1991), both of which cemented their transition from their earlier power metal sound to progressive metal, with the band also experimenting with opera-inspired lyrics.

The band's seventh album Edge of Thorns (1993) garnered the band's only charting single "Edge of Thorns". On October 17, 1993, six months after the album's release, guitarist Criss Oliva was killed in a car accident. Following his death, Jon (along with producer Paul O'Neill) decided to continue Savatage in memory of his brother. The band released four more studio albums, and went through several lineup changes before going on an extended hiatus in 2002. During the years—partly even before the hiatus—members founded various new bands such as Jon Oliva's Pain, Trans-Siberian Orchestra, Circle II Circle and Doctor Butcher. On August 2, 2014, Savatage announced that they were reuniting for the 2015 Wacken Open Air; despite having discussed the possibility of more shows and new music, the band resumed their hiatus. The members of Savatage claimed in interviews conducted in 2020–2021 that they were working on new material together, with a reunion of the band confirmed by Jon Oliva in April 2023. They are currently working on their first studio album in more than two decades, tentatively titled Curtain Call, with an intended release date of 2026.

== History ==
=== Early days (1979–1986) ===
Criss Oliva and his brother Jon formed their first band together, called Avatar, in 1979. Their former bands were Tower and Alien, respectively. In 1980, the duo met up with drummer Steve "Doc" Wacholz and practiced in a small shack behind the Oliva home that was dubbed "The Pit" by the band. Wacholz originally tried out to be part of Jon's band, Alien, but when the first Savatage lineup was taking shape, Jon, who was originally on drum duties, was relieved of them by Wacholz. They also gave Wacholz a nickname that would follow him throughout his career: "Doctor Hardware Killdrums", often shortened to just "Doc" or "Doc Killdrums", which referred to his hard playing style.

Criss, Jon and Wacholz played Tampa (where they had moved with their family in the late 1970s) and Clearwater area clubs for many years. In 1981, Keith Collins joined them to relieve Jon of bass guitar duties. In late 2006, footage was released onto the internet of an early performance by Avatar at a gig in a Clearwater parking lot and was prominent in featuring an early version of the song "Holocaust", which would later be released on Savatage's first album and a cover of Van Halen's "Eruption" and the latter's cover version of "You Really Got Me". In 1982, Avatar took part in some heavy metal compilations, most notably The YNF Pirate Tape, a promotion by Tampa rock radio station 95YNF for local Florida bands. Shortly after its release, Avatar was forced to change its name due to copyright issues. Combining the words "Savage" and "Avatar", the band decided on Savatage.

We wrote out Avatar on a big piece of poster paper... and Criss said, "Put a big S (like Kiss) in front of Avatar," and it was like, "Savatar." I was like, "That sounds like a really bad dinosaur," but we liked the way it looked. So then finally, out of nowhere, I don't remember who it was—it might have been Criss' wife or my wife—somebody said, "Take the R out and put a GE," and we did, and it was "Savatage." I was like, "That was cool," not "Sa-va-tage," but "Savatage," like "Sava" for Savage and "Tage" for mystical or whatever. From that moment on we were Savatage.

— Jon Oliva

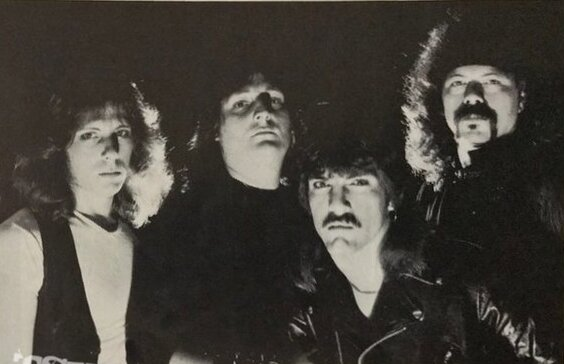
Savatage as Avatar in 1983

Their first album, Sirens (1983) and the following EP The Dungeons Are Calling (1984), were released on Par Records, an independent label. In 1984, they signed a contract with Atlantic Records and released their second full-length album Power of the Night in May of the following year. Power of the Night (produced by Max Norman) showcased the band's unorthodox approach to metal, which included Jon's liberal use of keyboards on songs like "Fountain of Youth" and Broadway-style song structures like the kind employed on "Warriors". It was well received by critics but fell short of sales expectations. Atlantic budgeted to provide funds to make a video for "Hard for Love", on the condition that it be retitled "Hot for Love" for broadcast purposes. The band refused to change the song and consequently the video was never released. In promotion of Power of the Night, Savatage embarked on the Monsters of the Universe Tour with Rogue Male and Illusion, and also played with Mötley Crüe, Quiet Riot, Exodus, Raven, Overkill and Armored Saint.

In 1986, after the release of their third album, Fight for the Rock, a failed attempt at a commercial approach imposed by the record company which the band themselves called Fight for the Nightmare, Savatage toured with Metallica, Kiss and Motörhead. The band was not happy with the album, with pressure from the label to include two cover versions. Jon Oliva had been retained to write material for other artists on the Atlantic label, such as John Waite and other pop-rock artists. Later, the label demanded Savatage record the material themselves. In a choice they would later regret, the band agreed. Not only did it destroy them in the press, it nearly destroyed the band and sent Jon into his early alcohol and drug problems. Jon recently admitted however the album did have strong points, including the band's cover of Badfinger's "Day After Day". During this time, original bassist Keith Collins left the band, and Johnny Lee Middleton joined the band. Since 1987, Middleton has been the only consistent member of Savatage, performing on every album (except Handful of Rain).

=== Rise to popularity and death of Criss Oliva (1987–1993) ===
The commercial failure of Fight for the Rock resulted in Savatage nearly disbanding, during which Jon auditioned for Black Sabbath and Criss had considered joining Megadeth; however, Jon decided that he and Criss "didn't want to split up", and were encouraged by producer Paul O'Neill to continue Savatage. In 1987, the band released their first commercially successful album, and first collaboration with O'Neill, Hall of the Mountain King, which became the base for the band rising into a more mainstream arena. They recorded their first music video for the album's title song, which received extensive air play on MTV's Headbangers Ball, and was followed up by a video for the song "24 Hours Ago". A world tour in support of the album throughout 1987 and 1988 followed, playing with a variety of bands like Dio, Megadeth, Iron Maiden, Testament, Sanctuary, Pandemonium, Nuclear Assault, Heathen, Forbidden, and Helstar. Hall of the Mountain King not only found a new audience for Savatage, but also introduced a new musical style, featuring symphonic elements, strongly influenced by O'Neill, that would shape the band's future recordings. O'Neill contributed most of the lyrics for the rest of their career and gave them a more conceptual edge starting with their next album, Gutter Ballet.

Gutter Ballet, which was released in January 1990, has been considered the band's true turning point. This album saw the band adopt a more progressive style, writing longer songs with more complex melodies and differing vocal styles, rather than the more straightforward power metal style that was apparent in earlier works. The change to a more progressive, operatic style was also precipitated by Jon, after seeing a performance of Phantom of the Opera in Toronto. The songs "Gutter Ballet" and "When the Crowds Are Gone" are examples of this influence from that album, as was the next Savatage's release (which even included "Opera" in its title). Many additional songs already written, before the decision of this change of style, were unused and subsequently published as bonus tracks, in the Sirens and The Dungeons Are Calling 2002 reissues, some of them were also re-worked and published by Jon Oliva's Pain. Gutter Ballet proved to be another success for Savatage, with the title track and "When the Crowds Are Gone" receiving considerable airplay on Headbangers Ball and album-oriented radio stations. The album was once again promoted with a grueling tour, which took place throughout most of 1990, touring North America with Testament and Nuclear Assault, and Europe with King Diamond and Candlemass. They also toured North America with Trouble.

Chris Caffery, who had been playing with Savatage in the previous tour performing rhythm guitar and keyboards offstage, officially joined the band in 1989. He never played on the Gutter Ballet album, even though he was credited with guitars and keyboards and was pictured in the album's booklet "both to prepare the fans for the lineup they'd see on tour and confirm his permanent member status". Despite this, Caffery left the band after the Gutter Ballet tour for personal reasons, but kept writing music with Jon Oliva and would later return to Savatage during the second half of the 1990s.

In 1991, the band created their first rock opera, Streets: A Rock Opera, featuring the story of a fallen rock star called DT Jesus who has hit hard times. The record did not sell as well as the band would have liked however, as it was released around the time that grunge exploded into the mainstream music arena, but a video for "Jesus Saves" was recorded and again got airplay, drawing a new audience to appreciate the band. Over the years Streets has become one of the most appreciated and a landmark album in Savatage's career. Originally, this record was intended to be a double album, but Atlantic Records did not like the idea, so it was trimmed down to 17 songs. The album was then going to have spoken tracks in-between all the songs but that was scrapped also. The final version scrapped the 17th song "Larry Elbows" and erased all the spoken tracks except for the intro to Jesus Saves. The cover had the story explained in it to make up for the lost spoken tracks. Atlantic somehow over the years managed to lose the master tapes to Streets so the left over songs truly are lost. Many of the riffs from these songs showed up on the next album Edge of Thorns. Another interesting detail about the album is that "Jesus Saves" was originally written as a midtempo song, not the rocker it became on the finished album. In 2013, a narrated version of the album was re-issued with the title: Streets: A Rock Opera - Narrated Version.

The world tour in support of Streets began in October 1991 in Europe, with support from Vicious Rumors. The next several months were spent touring relentlessly in North America, with the likes of Armored Saint and Fates Warning, followed by their first shows in Japan. After the Streets tour ended in the spring of 1992, Jon Oliva left the band to concentrate on his side projects Doctor Butcher and his Broadway-bound musical Romanov, as well as continuing co-writing Savatage material with his brother Criss and producer Paul O'Neill. However, as of 2013, only one instrumental track from the Romanov project was released under the moniker Trans-Siberian Orchestra on the Dreams of Fireflies EP. After this EP, together with a Broadway version of Streets named Gutter Ballet (including mainly songs from both these albums), even Romanov was planned as a future Trans-Siberian Orchestra album.

On June 13, 1992, during Jon's "farewell show" at the Rock-It Club in Tampa, 28 songs were played to cover all the main highlights of the band. This show was not intended, recorded or filmed for any sort of live album.

The new lead vocalist, former Wicked Witch singer Zachary Stevens, was discovered and introduced to the band by Criss' best friend and guitar technician Dan Campbell. The band recorded their follow-up to Streets, Edge of Thorns, in 1993. Drummer Steve Wacholz decided to record the album but he was not interested in touring, even though he stated he intended to return to the band in the future, and hand-picked his replacement as well in drummer Andy James. For the first time, Savatage began to enjoy mainstream recognition, including increased radio play and a world tour which gained international press as "the best Savatage has ever sounded live". However, tragedy struck when founder and lead guitarist Criss Oliva was killed by a drunk driver on October 17, 1993. Jon chose to continue the band, although he has since admitted that the band was pretty much over after Criss' death, but only kept going because of his memory and to "keep his music alive".

=== After Criss and second era of the band (1994–2000) ===
A short while after Criss' death, the band held a tribute show for the late guitarist, with the same lineup as the Streets tour but without Criss. Lead guitarist Alex Skolnick of Testament temporarily joined Savatage in 1994 for the release of their ninth album Handful of Rain, written by Jon Oliva and Paul O'Neill. Although the album is technically a Jon Oliva solo album, with Jon handling all instrumental duties except for vocals by Zachary Stevens and lead guitars by Skolnick, the record was released under the Savatage moniker with bass and drum credits given to Middleton and Wacholz respectively, as drummer Andy James had left the band following the death of Criss Oliva to pursue other projects. The song "Chance" was the first Savatage song to contain the usage of counterpoint vocals, a style which they continued to use on following albums. The album's final track, "Alone You Breathe", was a tribute to Criss Oliva.

When the band were preparing to tour in support of Handful of Rain, drummer Steve Wacholz announced his official departure from the band. Jeff Plate, a former bandmember of Zak Stevens' old band, was hired to replace him. Jon Oliva agreed to do the tour to perform keyboards and rhythm guitar, and a live CD/VHS, entitled Japan Live '94 (in later releases it has been retitled Live in Japan), was released at the conclusion of the very short tour with Skolnick's three-piece band Exhibit-A and power metal band Tempo Tantrum as supporting-acts. After this tour, Alex Skolnick left the band to pursue other interests. In a 2011 interview, Skolnick had this to say about his time with Savatage:

Savatage was a very bittersweet situation. On the one hand I got to do an album with a band that I liked in high school. The flipside is that the gig came about because of a tragedy: Savatage guitarist Criss Oliva had passed away in 1993. That was around the time that I had left my band, Testament, because things hadn't been working out, and I found playing with Savatage appealing. It was like, "Hey, why not?" Then again, I knew I was heading in a different direction from the band, but I just didn't know where. For some reason, joining Savatage just didn't feel right. I'm not sure why that is ... It wasn't one particular thing. Maybe I felt I needed to ... be one of the main creative voices in the band. If I had stayed with Savatage I wouldn't have been.

While Skolnick adapted Criss Oliva's solos to his own style, former guitarist Chris Caffery, who had left after the Gutter Ballet tour, was convinced he could do them better. He then told Jon Oliva that he would rejoin the band to pay tribute to his friend and mentor Criss Oliva on the condition that he would play all of Criss' solos, which the band accepted. Atlantic Records, however, wanted a second, more well-known guitarist to join the band, and Al Pitrelli was chosen. Pitrelli was known for his previous work with Alice Cooper and Asia, among others, and would play the majority of the lead parts of the band's new material.

In 1995, Savatage released their second rock opera Dead Winter Dead, an even more ambitious undertaking than its predecessor, Streets. They also achieved cross-over success with "Christmas Eve Sarajevo 12/24", which received heavy rotation on multiple radio formats during the Christmas season. While they toured Europe and Japan, the group forwent an American tour to work on their new project, Christmas Eve and Other Stories, recorded by the Trans-Siberian Orchestra (TSO), comprising Savatage and a large orchestra. Jon Oliva has since admitted that he was annoyed to see the success of TSO with what was originally a Savatage song, leading him to believe that the biggest barrier to success as Savatage was the name.

Also in 1995, another live album Ghost in the Ruins – A Tribute to Criss Oliva was published with old recordings taken during the Gutter Ballet tour. This release is titled Final Bell in Japan and Ghost in the Ruins elsewhere. Ghost in the Ruins was one of the titles the band had previously considered for the album Streets.

The eleventh studio album, The Wake of Magellan, was released in 1997 after a break to deal with the huge success of TSO, and dealt with such concepts as the worth of a life, suicide and drug abuse, drawing on real-life events such as the Maersk Dubai and the murder of Veronica Guerin. Savatage parted ways with long-time label Atlantic after this release and eventually signed on with a much smaller organization, Nuclear Blast (although Trans-Siberian Orchestra albums would in the future remain on the Atlantic/Lava imprint). Jon Oliva said that this was a good move, as Nuclear Blast "loved the band and they know [their] songs and everything!".

Due to Jon, O'Neill and Savatage's long time engineer Robert Kinkel's songwriting, the main differences between Savatage's last two albums and Trans-Siberian Orchestra are the usage of a real orchestra and the fact lead vocals are not played only by Oliva and/or Zachary Stevens, as in Savatage, but by a huge number of guest singers.

Savatage headlined Wacken Open Air in 1998.

=== Hiatus and side projects (2001–2013) ===
The Poets and Madmen touring lineup, 2001. From left to right: Jeff Plate, Chris Caffery, Jon Oliva, Damond Jiniya, Johnny Lee Middleton, Jack Frost.

Savatage continued to focus on their Trans-Siberian Orchestra project for a while, releasing The Christmas Attic, but the release of Poets and Madmen in 2001 was highlighted by Jon Oliva's return as lead vocalist in studio, replacing Zak Stevens, who left the band citing family reasons, and the departure of Al Pitrelli, who accepted an offer to join Megadeth in 2000. Pitrelli did record solos for some songs prior to his departure. Another very limited US tour followed, supported by Fates Warning in the early shows, and then Nevermore for the remainder. Around this time, Caffery chose Zak's replacement in the form of the singer Damond Jiniya (Diet of Worms), who was once again brought to the band from long-time friend and Circle II Circle manager/co founder Dan Campbell. Damond sang the song "Edge of Thorns" as his audition song. Damond performed Zak's parts on tour, with Jon having an increased vocal role in proceedings. Jack Frost auditioned for the role of rhythm guitar player, and got the gig. He played with the band for a majority of the tour, but was mysteriously asked to leave the band after the tour, although it could be said that Frost's commitments elsewhere drove him from the band. For Summer festival appearances in 2002, the band was joined by Annihilator's Jeff Waters. These festival performances included an appearance at Wacken Open Air in 2002.

Savatage had remained inactive since that tour, with band members concentrating on other projects such as Trans-Siberian Orchestra and Jon Oliva's Pain. This has not pleased everyone, with Chris Caffery in particular citing his anger at Savatage not recording a new album in almost five years as of 2006.

Trans-Siberian Orchestra continues with their releases and Savatage's members are mostly split up between its two touring lineups, but during the European tours in 2011 and 2014 Pitrelli, Caffery, Middleton and Plate were all featured together on stage. Year by year more Savatage songs were included in the TSO setlists, among them also Gutter Ballet, Believe, All That I Bleed and Chance. Jon Oliva usually does not play on stage with Trans-Siberian Orchestra while Paul O'Neill did it very often during selected songs before his death in 2017.

Jon Oliva formed his own band, Jon Oliva's Pain, and released their debut album in 2004 entitled 'Tage Mahal. Through the years Jon Oliva's Pain, also called JOP, published many records and their live concerts always feature Savatage's songs from the albums with Criss Oliva. Additional material, taken by Jon from his brother's unused stuff, was used to write several Jon Oliva's Pain's tracks as described in the album's credits.

Lead guitarist Chris Caffery also recorded solo albums, while frontman Zak Stevens was approached by longtime friend and Savatage stage manager Dan Campbell to co-found a new band Circle II Circle and their first record entitled Watching in Silence was released in 2003, produced by Jon Oliva and featuring a guest appearance from Caffery. After a dispute with the management during the tour, Zak's entire band left and joined Jon Oliva's Pain band. Zak regrouped with new members and release other new records. Since 2011, the band included more and more Savatage songs (from the records with Stevens at vocals) in their setlists, and in 2012 also the entire The Wake of Magellan album was played. Their 2013 European tour included the complete Edge of Thorns album due to its 20th anniversary while the 2014 European tour included the complete Handful of Rain album for the same reason.

In addition to his work with Trans-Siberian Orchestra, drummer Jeff Plate performed with electric violinist Mark Wood and joined Metal Church. He also reformed Wicked Witch with Zak Stevens, renaming the band Machines of Grace, and releasing a self-titled album in 2010.

Never involved with Trans-Siberian Orchestra, Steve Wacholz formed a new band in 2010, named Reverence, with guitarist Pete Rossi, vocalist Todd Michael Hall (formerly of Jack Starr's Burning Starr and currently in Riot V) and former Tokyo Blade members guitarist Bryan Holland and bassist Frank Saparti.

We all loved Savatage but we gave Savatage its chance to get to the level where it was supposed to get to and it never did, for whatever reasons, you know - we had tragedies, everything like that. But to me Savatage was never Savatage after Criss died. All these other lineups of the band that people heard from "Edge Of Thorns" (1993, Atlantic Records) on, to me was more like Trans-Siberian Orchestra actually than Savatage.

— Jon Oliva

==== Criss Oliva 10th anniversary memorial concert ====
On October 17, 2003, at The Masquerade in historic Ybor City, Tampa, Florida, fans were invited to remember and celebrate the life and contributions of Criss Oliva at a 10th anniversary memorial concert. It featured Circle II Circle, Jon Oliva's Pain and Doctor Butcher as supporting acts and, as headliner, a special one night only band (composed of Jon Oliva, Johnny Lee Middleton, Steve "Doc" Wacholz, Chris Caffery and John Zahner) who played only selected songs from the albums with Criss Oliva. Many Criss parts were executed by Jon himself using keyboards. This show was not intended, recorded or filmed for any sort of live album.

==== Reunion rumors ====
In an interview to Aardschok, a Dutch Magazine, in June 2006, Jon Oliva announced that he wanted to record one more Savatage album, with a live CD and DVD to follow it, before ending the band. He did not specify a release date for a new album, however. Chris Caffery then said in an interview in October 2006 that if a new Savatage album was to be recorded, then it was likely that Alex Skolnick would be involved, as well as original drummer Steve "Doc" Wacholz. In a November 2006 interview with Greek website, Metal Temple, Jon Oliva himself shot down all rumours of the return of Savatage, claiming that it never made him any money, but instead it cost him one million US dollars to keep the band going over the years.

Jon also said that his new band, Jon Oliva's Pain, was basically Savatage reincarnated, so it could co-exist with the more successful Trans-Siberian Orchestra. He did however state that a one-off anniversary tour featuring Skolnick, Wacholz and other past Savatage members is being planned with Paul O'Neill as a final send off to the band. Zachary Stevens had made it clear that he would participate in a 25th anniversary festivities with the band. Jon Oliva then said about the band "Well, it's over but it's not over, you know what I mean? It's over right now because no one's doing anything. We haven't disbanded or anything. We have plans to do something in the future." Jon also announced that he is doing "some video compilation stuff, and editing old things for a bonus DVD to go with it, that has a ton of live Criss stuff in concert, a lot of backstage frolicking about, and going to castles in Europe".

In 2007, Jon denied any rumours of a Savatage reunion and tour, as the Trans-Siberian Orchestra has become a year-round commitment, adding that Jon Oliva's Pain is "as close to Savatage as you can get". Despite Jon's earlier denials, in October 2008 the band launched an official MySpace page, hinting that 2009 would see some activity under the Savatage banner. The lineup listed on official MySpace was: Jon Oliva, Zak Stevens, Chris Caffery, Al Pitrelli, Johnny Lee Middleton and Jeff Plate; signalling that Stevens would return as lead vocalist in a reunion. In December of the same year, a brand new Savatage web site was unveiled. However, Jon Oliva had since denied these reunion rumors saying:

There has been some news floating around about a Savatage website update and other things Sava related. I just wanted to clarify that this news is strictly limited to the re-release of the entire Savatage catalog as well as merchandise from prior tours that will be made available soon. But just to be 100% clear there are no plans in the future for any Savatage recordings or shows! JOP is currently hard at work in pre-production for the 4th release, as well as preparing for the Euro-Festivals and South American tours in 2009.

I just wanted to get something out there to kind of cap things off because I've moved on. Those reunion rumors ... some people have been saying things they probably shouldn't have. There was talk about doing a show to kind of give Savatage a send-off but the logistics of doing so just made it impossible. The guys have the Trans-Siberian Orchestra, I have my JOP stuff, there's a lot of other things keeping us busy. It's pretty aggravating, though, with people always asking about when it's going to happen and pushing to have one. I mean, Savatage hasn't done anything in almost 10 years! It's just a small group of people, but they just won't let it go and I can't figure out why. You have the Savatage guys in the Trans-Siberian Orchestra, which was spawned from the Dead Winter Dead and Wake of Magellan era of the band, you have Jon Oliva's Pain doing a lot of the old Savatage material, what more do you want? Don't get me wrong. I love Savatage and it'll always be dear to my heart because that was my start, man. I still play the songs, I love playing those songs, but I've got a whole new career now. I'm on my fourth record with JOP for crying out loud! It's like, to the people that keep pushing for a Savatage reunion, just let it go. I've got the rights back for the Sirens and Dungeons albums, so I might do something with those in a few years, but JOP is my focus now and I'm hoping people will finally catch on that I have a new band (laughs).

In 2013, in support for Jon's first solo album Raise the Curtain, Oliva had been giving many interviews, and during at least one he mentioned the possibility of new Savatage music was something he was considering. While discussing the success of TSO and the decision to cease activities as Savatage with Dr. Metal on June 30, 2013, he had this to say about the idea of new Savatage recordings:

If Savatage would have released Dead Winter Dead and it sold 2 million records, we wouldn't be having this conversation right now. Somebody else explain to me how I could release the same song the next year and it sell millions. And then I walk around and I've got 6 platinum records on my wall, and not one of them says Savatage on it, folks. So what am I supposed to do? I've got a family to take care of. I've got responsibilities. I gave it as much time as I could to break. Now I have something that's become very successful. It's paid the bills for everybody, it's provided a living for all the guys from Savatage. We're still a family, we're still together, we still love each other. Why would I want to do anything to destroy that? Why would I want to put a monkey wrench in that to rehearse a week and go put a Savatage thing together? It doesn't make any sense to me. Now I'm up for maybe doing some recordings, maybe put together a 4-song or 5-song EP or something, but I can't shut down what provides a living for so many people, the Savatage guys mostly. It just doesn't make any sense to me. I think a lot of times Chris [Caffery] and Johnny and those guys just miss those days, and believe me, I miss them, too. I miss them probably more than any of them do. Johnny and Chris have been around for a while, but I was there for ten years before Johnny and Chris Caffery were around. So if anyone understands it, I do understand, but we just don't have the time to do both. That's why we had to make that decision—is it going to be Savatage, is it going to be TSO? The numbers don't lie. You can't fight the numbers. TSO sells out 40,000 tickets a day. I've done whole tours with Savatage in America where we didn't play in front of 40,000 people in 6 weeks, and people still argue with me about it. It drives me crazy. I'm like, "I don't get it. I don't get it, guys. I don't get it." I understand, but Savatage was a great band, and I want it to live on its legacy. I don't want to just slap something together real quick and cheapen the name. If I was ever going to do that, it would have to be big, at the level of TSO, the production and everything. I'm not just going to slap it together. That wouldn't be right, and I don't think it's necessary. Maybe we'll do some recording, though, maybe do an EP and put it out as a special thing.

=== One-off reunion, death of Paul O'Neill and second hiatus (2014–2019) ===
On August 2, 2014, it was announced that Trans-Siberian Orchestra would be performing live on stage at Wacken Open Air 2015, followed immediately by a Savatage reunion gig. It was announced as Savatage's only live show in Europe in 2015, which led to speculation that it would be a one-off reunion show, or the band had planned to continue performing in the future.

Asked in a December 2014 interview if Savatage would do any more live shows or record new material, guitarist Chris Caffery replied, "I'm gonna put it this way: for 12 years, 13 years, I've been waiting for my band to play again. We're playing again. I don't know what's going to happen after that [laughs], but there were people that were putting a fork in it, and we're getting up and not just running a marathon, we're running in the Olympics with this festival being what it is. I'm not going to make any predictions, but let's just say there's a possibility that something more will happen after Wacken—that's all I can say. And nothing would make me happier."

On the future of Savatage, frontman Jon Oliva explained, "As far as that goes, the whole Wacken thing came up, and I was, like, you know what? If we're going to do anything, we have to do it now. I don't want to do it when I'm 60 years old. I mentioned that to Paul. He said to me, 'We're going to do the Wacken thing, but let's just wait until the winter tour is over and then you and me we're going to sit down in January and discuss what we're going to do.'" Jon also said that Savatage has "already gotten offers" to play in "certain areas of the world, America being one, Greece, South America, places like that", and added that he does not rule out the possibility of any more shows. Though Oliva said he does not know what the future holds for Savatage, he said, "I just wish that everything works out good and then we'll see what happens down the road. I'll never say no to anything anymore, because every time I do, I get rained on."

The Wacken started with a performance of Savatage on the Black Stage, featuring Gutter Ballet as first song. After seven songs the band left the stage, and on the True Metal Stage TSO began to play with Pitrelli and its non-Sava members. Caffery, Middleton and Plate replaced them on several songs, and Stevens had a duet with Andrew Ross in the song "The Hourglass". This set was followed up by simultaneous play by both bands, featuring also Savatage and TSO songs, ending up with O'Neill's appearance on guitar in "Christmas Eve (Sarajevo 12/24)" and "Requiem (The Fifth)".

In October 2015, Zak Stevens confirmed the intentions of starting a new phase for Savatage, adding that (from November 1 on) there would be meetings to take decisions on the details, possibly a tour or a new album, as Jon Oliva was inspiredly writing new music.

When asked in April 2016 about Savatage's future, drummer Jeff Plate (who had recently released an album with Metal Church) stated, "This really is a question for Jon and Paul. We had a tremendous time last year when we performed at the Wacken Open Air Festival. It truly was great, and magical, to perform with that band again. I would love to put the Dead Winter Dead band back on the road again, but this is not my decision to be made."

In April 2017, it was announced that Savatage producer, lyricist and co-composer Paul O'Neill had died at the age of 61.

When asked in August 2017 about a possible reunion with a classic Savatage lineup (with Chris Caffery filling in for the late Criss Oliva on guitar), original drummer Steve "Doc" Wacholz mentioned a Savatage tour taking place in 2018. However, he stated, "I really can't imagine them having TWO drummers on stage, so Jeff will be doing the drumming duties on his own (which he does a great job), although I would love to finish what I started with the Olivas so long ago. That would be a great accomplishment, but I do not see it happening."

In a September 2018 interview with Bill Louis of WNCX radio, Plate stated that he would "really love to see" a Savatage reunion, but added that O'Neill's death and the success of Trans-Siberian Orchestra were the reasons the band has been sidelined since their 2015 reunion show at Wacken Open Air. He explained, "There's always been that thought. We did get back together for the Wacken show in 2015. There was a lot of talk after that show, because it was very well-received. When the band got back together, it's just so interesting how when a certain group of guys get together and play music, it's just different than plugging other people in. There's a real chemistry there with the six of us — Jon Oliva, Chris Caffery, Johnny Middleton, Al Pitrelli, myself and Zak Stevens. Of course, there's always interest, but when we lost Paul, it had to get pushed aside. There's always conversations, and personally, I would really love to see it. We would love to make that happen, but with everything that's happened over the past couple of years, there's a lot going on there. Once all the business end of this whole scenario gets sorted out here and we all get in a room and really talk about some things... It's going to take a little time — none of this stuff is easy — but I would love to see it happen. I know a lot of people would, and I know a number of guys in the band would really like to see it happen too. But Trans-Siberian Orchestra, that's the focus — that has been our success, and this is what our careers have become. If we can somehow squeeze some Savatage music or some shows in there around all this, that would be fantastic."

When asked in December 2019 about the current state of Savatage, Stevens said: "You've always got Savatage lurking out there that we really don't know for sure either. Basically the same answer that I get from them is what I'm giving for Circle II Circle — 'You know what? It's not ever gone, but we just have to figure out what [to do], and the answer will come.' When the right situation appears, that's when I think things will happen... It needs the right thing to come along. I like the fact that TSO has five Savatage songs in the last half of the set this year, so something's brewing... I don't really have any more answers after that, but something seems like it's going on. We're going to find out one way or the other at some point, but the right situation has to come along, I think."

=== Second reunion and upcoming twelfth studio album (since 2020) ===
In November 2020, when commenting on the possibility of a full-time reunion of Savatage, guitarist Al Pitrelli revealed that Jon Oliva "is always working on new music, constantly sending [him] new songs and new ideas", and added, "We always talk about doing something, I would like more than ever to get the band back together and back on tour." Pitrelli also stated that there has not yet been any discussion of a tour with the agents or promoters, and concluded, "What I do know is that we all talk about it often, particularly now that we have a lot of time to talk. The conversation is still open, I spoke to Chris Caffery...Jeff Plate, Johnny Lee, we all talk about it all the time, it's just a matter of saying, 'Okay, let's leave this pandemic behind and focus on the important things in life!'"

In December 2020 interview with Brave Words, guitarist Chris Caffery hinted at Savatage releasing a new album in 2022. When asked about the possibility of the band carrying on without their late friend and producer Paul O'Neill, he said, "I mean we've been speaking about it for the last 20 years now, since the last record. It's always able to happen and something else stops it - you've got Haley's Comet coming around once in a while, and every hundred years you have a pandemic, and once every 20 years there's a Savatage record. It will be 20 years in 2022 so maybe that's when it will show up. I'm kind of hopeful that it does, I know I've done a lot of writing, and Jon has, and Al always has a lot of music, so we could make a record. Things would never be exactly the same without Paul, but they were never exactly the same without Criss Oliva either, but we still managed to do Dead Winter Dead and Wake of Magellan and Poets and Madmen." Caffrey also offered an update on the state of Jon Oliva's health, saying, "He's doing much better, because a couple of years ago he had a bit of an incident. So he hit a bump in the road with something inside of him. I see the masked mountain king every day and probably the last four five years he's looked the best he has to me."

In February 2021, Savatage announced that their first album Sirens and the EP The Dungeons Are Calling were being released to streaming platforms in the US for the first time. In a statement issued by the band, they wrote, "This is just the start of many new exciting things we have in store for you this year"; this led to speculation that there would be Savatage-related activities in 2021.

After months of rumors that a reunion and new album from Savatage were planned, vocalist Jon Oliva confirmed in a March 2021 interview with "80's Glam Metalcast" that he, Caffery and Pitrelli had indeed been working on new material together: "Since [Savatage's] Wacken [reunion] show in 2015, Chris Caffery, me and Al Pitrelli, we've been trading song ideas for a possible Savatage thing over the phone. I go, 'Hey, this is great. This is great. This is cool.' But I've been writing Savatage material since 2003, and I could do a quadruple double album, if I wanted to. So, yeah, we're trading off things, and we're looking at that." As for a possibility of a full-time reunion, Oliva stated that he would "love" to do it, adding that "it's very possible": "If it's gonna happen, we'll make an official announcement, but we have been working together, just because with the pandemic and all that, we're bored; there's nothing to do. So we've been trading ideas through e-mails and on the phone. Me and Al wrote three or four things together. Me and Chris Caffery have worked on a few things together. What else are we gonna do? There's nothing to do. So, yeah, we'll see what happens." In June 2021, Oliva reiterated that he had enough material for three new Savatage albums and all the band members "would all love" to work on new material, but added that "there's no deal with a record company to do it" and there were no plans to go into the studio.

In a December 2021, Caffery offered an update on new possible music from Savatage to That Metal Interview: "We've been writing and talking about it now. It's the first time in a long time where I actually have been trading riffs and songs with Jon over the phone, and I have some really cool things. I have this one song that I wrote that he really likes and it's kind of one that I think would be a good lead-off track for Savatage. [We're] just calling it 'The Dungeous Are Calling Again' and it's a really, really, really cool metal song. We'll see what happens. I know a lot of people would like to see a new Savatage record. I think the cards are lining up. Whether or not it's gonna fall into place, we'll find out. I always tend to stay really positive and optimistic about it — I have for 20 years. So hopefully it does wind up happening. We're not getting any younger."

In April 2023, Jon Oliva confirmed to Rock Hard magazine that Savatage would reconvene in June to begin recording their first studio album in more than two decades, to which he said will "probably be the last album [they] ever do" and revealed Curtain Call as its working title. Oliva confirmed that the lineup of the new album would include all members of the Dead Winter Dead lineup (including his replacement Zak Stevens) as well as contributions by original drummer Steve Wacholz, and added that he wanted to have it released on what would have been his late brother Criss' 61st birthday in 2024. Jon revealed in a September 2023 interview that work on the new Savatage album had stopped, due to him fracturing his spine, and the band was expected to resume work on it in early 2024: "I slipped on a wet marble floor and I fractured my T7 vertebrae. It is very painful; I'm actually in a lot of pain right now. I have to wear this kind of like a harness vest support thing for four months." Progress on the album continued to be slow by December 2024, with Caffery saying, "The music is being written and it keeps being written. As far as when it's going to be finished, there is not a date. Let's just put it this way that when we can, we will get music done." Stevens added, "We've been recording stuff for a while now. I mean, I've got about probably eight or nine songs that I've been working on with Jon." In April 2025, Oliva confirmed that he wants to begin recording the new Savatage album in January 2026: "That's my goal, is to start recording new material. The songs are basically all written. They just — I need to be healthy to be able to do it. I can't sing like I sing without feeling like somebody's stabbing me with a screwdriver."

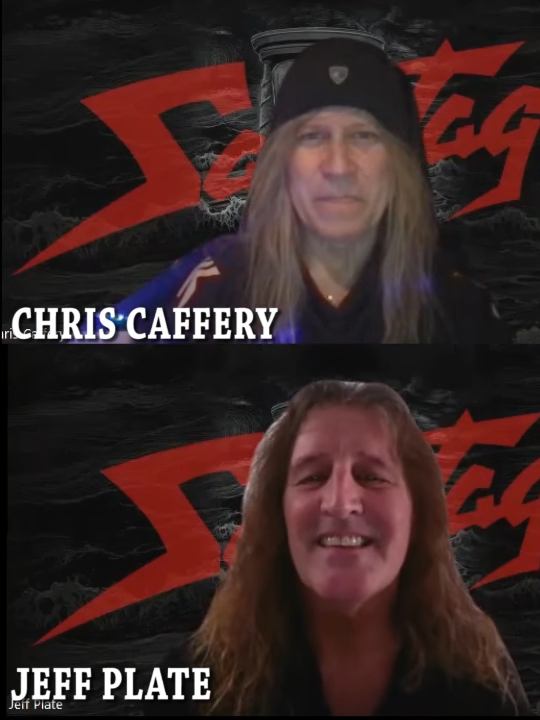
Caffery and Plate being interviewed in 2025

Savatage played their first show in nearly ten years at the Monsters of Rock festival in São Paulo, Brazil on April 19, 2025, followed four days later by the band's first-ever show in Chile at the Masters of Rock festival. Due to his diagnosis with both multiple sclerosis and Ménière's disease, Oliva did not perform at those shows. During the spring/summer of 2025, Savatage played their first shows in Europe in more than 20 years, which include headlining shows and appearances at festivals such as Into the Grave in the Netherlands, Graspop Metal Meeting in Belgium, and Rock Fest in Spain.

The band will tour Europe in June through August of 2026 on what is dubbed the "Prelude to Madness" tour. Select dates will feature support from Nevermore, Armored Saint and Vision Divine. It will be the band's first time performing in the cities of Istanbul, Bucharest, Este, Warsaw, and Leipzig, and also features a show with orchestra in the Amphiteatre of Pompeii. In addition to nine headline dates, the tour will also include several festival appearances, such as the 2026 Wacken Open Air music festival in Germany. To coincide with this tour, Savatage released a new live album Madness Reigns from the Gutter (1990), recorded during the Gutter Ballet tour, on June 26, 2026.

== Musical style ==
Savatage and its former variations started out as a heavy metal band, incorporating Jon Oliva's powerful, sometimes screamed vocals accompanied by Criss Oliva's heavy guitar riffs and fast, melodic solos. When bassist Johnny Lee Middleton joined in 1986, the band took a step in the direction of radio-friendly hard rock due to label pressure, but to no success.

In 1987, producer Paul O'Neill was brought in and added symphonic elements to the band's sound, making Hall of the Mountain King the band's first progressive metal album. Around this time, vocalist Jon Oliva also started focusing more on keyboards and piano.

Gutter Ballet was named in reference to an unpublished Broadway project Paul O'Neill wrote in 1979. Despite using this name for their fifth studio album, the band decided to focus on it with their follow-up album Streets: A Rock Opera. As its name implies, Streets is a rock opera, the first of many to follow. Trans-Siberian Orchestra reprised, in recent years, the idea to release a Gutter Ballet musical close to O'Neill original script featuring Savatage's music as well.

After the departure of Jon Oliva, his replacement Zachary Stevens brought in a very different vocal sound. The band continued on the progressive metal/hard rock path, and when Jon Oliva rejoined the band, albums would often feature a few songs with him on lead vocals.

One of the band's trademarks, especially in the band's later years, were the counterpoint and harmony vocals. In Savatage's early years, guitarist Criss Oliva would sometimes provide backing vocals, but this decreased dramatically over the years so he could focus on guitar playing. The band's 1994 album Handful of Rain saw the introduction of counterpoint vocals with the song "Chance", and the subsequent albums had some of these incorporated as well. In the studio, Stevens' vocals would be layered on top of each other, but live Jon Oliva, Chris Caffery, Al Pitrelli and Johnny Lee Middleton would all also perform vocals.

Savatage's main influences include Iron Maiden, Judas Priest, Led Zeppelin, Black Sabbath, Deep Purple, AC/DC, Van Halen, Rainbow, UFO, The Beatles, Rush, The Who, Metallica, Pink Floyd, Queen, Motörhead, Scorpions, Accept, Saxon and Jethro Tull. The band has been cited as an influence or inspiration to numerous bands, including The Smashing Pumpkins, Pantera, Testament, Death, Morbid Angel, Obituary, Blind Guardian, Iced Earth, Artillery, Nasty Savage, and Anacrusis.

== In popular culture ==
The song "Hall of the Mountain King" from the album of the same name was used in the video game Brütal Legend.

German power metal band Powerwolf covered "Edge of Thorns" on the deluxe edition of their 2015 album Blessed & Possessed.

The song "Christmas Eve (Sarajevo 12/24)" from Dead Winter Dead was used in The Office in season 8 episode 10 "Christmas Wishes".

== Band members ==
Current members

- Jon Oliva – keyboards (1981–1992, 1993, 1994–2002, 2014–2015, since 2023), lead and backing vocals (1978–1992, 2001–2002, 2014–2015, since 2023), guitar (1978–1980, 1994), bass (1978, 1994), drums (1981, 1991, 1994)
- Johnny Lee Middleton – bass guitar, backing vocals (1986–2002, 2014–2015, since 2023)
- Chris Caffery – guitar, vocals (1987–1990, 1995–2002, 2014–2015, since 2023), keyboards (1987–1990)
- Zachary Stevens – lead vocals (1992–2000, 2014–2015, since 2023)
- Jeff Plate – drums (1994–2002, 2014–2015, since 2023)
- Al Pitrelli – guitar, backing vocals (1995–1999, 2002, 2014–2015, since 2023)

== Discography ==
- Sirens (1983)
- Power of the Night (1985)
- Fight for the Rock (1986)
- Hall of the Mountain King (1987)
- Gutter Ballet (1990)
- Streets: A Rock Opera (1991)
- Edge of Thorns (1993)
- Handful of Rain (1994)
- Dead Winter Dead (1995)
- The Wake of Magellan (1997)
- Poets and Madmen (2001)
