= The Dungeons Are Calling =

EP by Savatage
- Released: 1984
- Recorded: January 1983
- Studios: Morrisound (Tampa, Florida)
- Genres: Heavy metal, power metal
- Length: 24:54
- Label: Par Records
- Producer: Dan Johnson

Savatage chronology
Sirens (1983)	The Dungeons Are Calling (1984)	Power of the Night (1985)

1994 CD edition cover

The Dungeons Are Calling is an EP by the American heavy metal band Savatage, released in 1984 by Par Records. Though the EP was not released until 1984, most of the songs featured on it and the debut album, Sirens, had been in the band set list since 1979, and are part of the Live in Clearwater and City Beneath the Surface EPs. The Dungeons Are Calling is a loosely based concept album and the title track, contrary to popular belief, is not about Hell or torture, but about the horrors of drug use. The song used many metaphors, which have been sometimes misunderstood.

The tracks on this EP were recorded the same day as the tracks for the Sirens album. The two were meant to be a full-length debut but were divided due to limited space for songs on vinyl. The two were released together in 2011 for the first time "as they were meant to be" (Jon Oliva).

The cover is a picture of a human skull with a homemade syringe, a reference to the title track of the album.

== Critical reception ==
Professional ratings
Review scores
Source	Rating
AllMusic	4/5 stars
The Collector's Guide to Heavy Metal	10/10
Rock Hard	9.5/10

In 2005, The Dungeons Are Calling was ranked number 349 in Rock Hard magazine's book The 500 Greatest Rock & Metal Albums of All Time.

== Track listing ==
Side one
No.	Title	Writer(s)	Length
1.	"The Dungeons Are Calling"	Jon Oliva, Criss Oliva, Keith Collins	4:55
2.	"By the Grace of the Witch"	J. Oliva, C. Oliva	3:16
3.	"Visions"	J. Oliva, C. Oliva	3:05

Side two
No.	Title	Writer(s)	Length
4.	"Midas Knight"	J. Oliva, C. Oliva, Collins	4:24
5.	"City Beneath the Surface"	J. Oliva, C. Oliva	5:49
6.	"The Whip"	J. Oliva	3:31

Bonus tracks (1994 CD reissue)
No.	Title	Writer(s)	Length
7.	"Fighting for Your Love" (demo)	J. Oliva, C. Oliva	3:20
8.	"Sirens" (live)	J. Oliva, C. Oliva	3:21

Bonus tracks (2002 Metal Blade reissue)
No.	Title	Writer(s)	Length
7.	"Metalhead" (demo)	J. Oliva, C. Oliva	4:46
8.	"Before I Hang" (demo)	J. Oliva, C. Oliva	4:12
9.	"Stranger in the Dark" (demo)	J. Oliva, C. Oliva	5:01
99.	"Piper Rap" (hidden track)		1:41

Bonus track (2011 EarMusic reissue)
No.	Title	Writer(s)	Length
16.	"In the Dream" (acoustic version)	J. Oliva, C. Oliva	3:34

== Personnel ==
Savatage

- Jon Oliva – lead vocals, synthesizer, keyboards
- Criss Oliva – guitars, backing vocals
- Keith Collins – bass, backing vocals
- Steve Wacholz – drums, percussion

Production

- Danny Johnson – producer
- Jim Morris – engineer
- Mike Fuller – mastering
- Eddy Schreyer – re-mastering

== Release history ==
Region	Date	Label	Format	Catalog
United States	1984	Par Records	Cassette	PAR1051M
United States	April 15, 1985	Combat	EP	MX 6016
Europe	1985	Music for Nations	EP	RR 9793

== Charts ==
Chart performance for The Dungeons Are Calling
Chart (2021)	Peak position
German Albums (Offizielle Top 100)	15
