= Dead Winter Dead =

Studio album by Savatage
- Released: October 24, 1995
- Recorded: June–August 1995
- Studios: Soundtrack Studios and Studio 900, New York City
- Genres: Heavy metal, progressive metal
- Length: 52:06
- Labels: Atlantic (US); Concrete/Edel (Germany); Zero Corporation (Japan)
- Producers: Paul O'Neill, Jon Oliva

Savatage chronology
Japan Live '94 (1995)	Dead Winter Dead (1995)	Ghost in the Ruins – A Tribute to Criss Oliva (1995)

Singles from Dead Winter Dead
- 1. "One Child" Released: 1996

Dead Winter Dead is the ninth studio album by the American heavy metal band Savatage, released in 1995. It is a concept album, that tells a story from the perspectives of a Serb boy, a Bosniak girl and an old man. The story of the album is set during the Bosnian War, which was ongoing at the time.

Dead Winter Dead marked the first Savatage album to feature guitarist Chris Caffery, who had been an occasional and touring member of the band since 1987, but had become an official permanent member by the time the album was recorded. Alex Skolnick, who had played guitars on Savatage's previous album Handful of Rain, opted not to stay around for the next album in order to concentrate on his solo band. Singer Jon Oliva took drummer Jeff Plate from the Handful of Rain tour, and brought in his old friend Caffery, former member and Doctor Butcher member to join the band. Atlantic Records also felt that the band needed a second, more well-known guitarist to complete the line-up. Al Pitrelli, formerly a member of Alice Cooper's touring band, became the co-lead guitarist for the band.

This record gave the band an unexpected radio hit in "Christmas Eve (Sarajevo 12/24)", and the band decided they wanted to explore this kind of music in a different way. Around this time, Paul O'Neill, along with Robert Kinkel, was interested in starting up what became the Trans-Siberian Orchestra (TSO). It was later re-released by TSO as "Christmas Eve/Sarajevo 1994" on their first release, Christmas Eve and Other Stories.

The track "Mozart and Madness" quotes directly from the opening theme of Mozart's Symphony No. 25, and was re-recorded as "Mozart and Memories" as released on the later TSO album "Night Castle"; whilst "Memory" quotes directly from the fourth movement of Beethoven's 9th symphony ("Ode to Joy").

== Story ==
In the Bosnian capital of Sarajevo, there is a town square surrounded by buildings that were constructed during the Middle Ages. The square has a beautiful stone fountain at its center and at one corner there is a thousand year old church with a gargoyle carved into its belfry. This gargoyle, for the last thousand years, has spent all his time trying to comprehend the human emotions of laughter and sorrow, but even after a millennium of contemplation, these most curious of human attributes remain a total mystery to him. Our story begins in the year of 1990; the Berlin Wall has just fallen, communism has collapsed and for the first time since the Roman Empire, Yugoslavia finds itself a free nation. Serdjan cannot believe his good fortune to be alive and young at such a moment. The future and the happiness of all seem assured in what must surely be "the best of times" ("Sarajevo", "This Is the Time").

However, even as Serdjan celebrates with his fellow countrymen, there are little men with little minds who are already busy sowing the seeds of hate between neighbors. Young and impressionable Serdjan joins some of his friends in a Serbian Militia Unit and eventually finds himself in the hills outside of Sarajevo firing mortar shells nightly in the city ("I Am"). Meanwhile, in Sarajevo itself, Katrina Brasic, a young Muslim girl, finds herself buying weapons from a group of arms merchants and then joining her comrades firing in the hills around the city ("Starlight", "Doesn't Matter Anyway").

The years pass by and it is now late November 1994. An old man who had left Yugoslavia many decades before, has now returned to the city of his birth, only to find it in ruins. As the season's first snowfall begins, he stands in the town square, looks toward the heavens and explains that when the Yugoslavians prayed for change, this is not what they intended ("This Isn't What We Meant").

As the old man finishes his prayer, the sun begins to set and the first shells of the evening's artillery barrage are starting to arc overhead. But instead of heading for the shelters with the rest of the civilians, he climbs atop the rubble that used to be the fountain and taking out his cello, starts to play Mozart as the shells explode around him. From this night forward he would repeat this ritual every evening. And every evening Serdjan and Katrina each find themselves listening to the thoughts of Mozart and Beethoven as they drift between the explosions across no man's land ("Mozart and Madness", "Memory").

Though the winter does its best to cover the landscape with a blanket of temporary innocence, the war only escalates in violence and brutality ("Dead Winter Dead"). One day in late December, Serdjan on a patrol in Sarajevo, comes across a schoolyard where a recent exploding shell has left the ground littered with the bodies of young children. It is one thing to drop shells into a mortar and quite another to see where they land. Long after Serdjan returns to his own lines, he cannot get the faces of the children out of his mind. Realizing that what he has been participating in is not the glorious nation building that their leaders had described, but rather a path to mutual oblivion, he decides right then and there that he can no longer be a part of this, that you cannot build a future on the bodies of others. At the first opportunity, he resolves that he will desert ("One Child").

Sitting in his bunker on December 24, he listens to the sounds of Christmas carols from the old cello player mingling with the sounds of war. Katrina, on the other side of the battlefield, is also listening. It had just stopped snowing and the clouds had given way to reveal a beautiful star-filled sky when suddenly the cellos player's music abruptly ceases. Fearing the worst, Serdjan and Katrina both do something quite foolish and from their respectives sides, start to make their ways across no man's land toward the town square. Arriving at exactly the same moment, they see one another. Instinctively realizing that they are both there for the same reason, they do not start to fight, but instead, together walk slowly to the fountain. There they find the old man lying dead in the snow, his face covered with blood, his cello lying smashed and broken at his side ("Christmas Eve (Sarajevo 12/24)").

Then without warning, a single drop of liquid falls from the cloudless sky, wiping some of the blood off the old man's cheek. Serdjan looks up, but he can see nothing except the stone gargoyle high up on the church belfry. Overcome by what he has seen this night, he decides that he must leave this war immediately. Turning to the Muslim girl he asks her to come with him, but now all she sees is his Serbian uniform. Pouring out his feelings, he explains that he is not what she thinks that he is. Eventually winning her to his side, they leave the night together ("Not What You See").

== Reception ==
Professional ratings
Review scores
Source	Rating
AllMusic	4/5 stars
The Collector's Guide to Heavy Metal	8/10
Metal Hammer (GER)	7/7
Rock Hard	8.5/10
Sputnikmusic	4.5/5

In a contemporary review, Matthias Breusch of Rock Hard magazine remarked how the album is the band's "most significant move so far in the direction of classical-symphonic bombast compositions" with "piano and string arrangements (...) omnipresent", even if "dedicated fans" would miss the "fine line between genius and madness, on which the interaction of the two Oliva brothers up to and including Edge of Thorns has driven every Savatage album." He judged "the instrumentals 'Overture: Sarajevo', 'Mozart and Madness' and 'Christmas Eve'" and the quieter numbers, "like the exquisite 'This Is Not What We Meant', 'Now What You See', 'This Is the Time' or 'One Child'", the true highlights of the album, while he considered the title track "somewhat lethargic" and the uptempo songs "mediocre".

Modern reviews are positive. AllMusic reviewer wrote that "Savatage have built upon the musical ground of Handful of Rain with grand but heavy arrangements of theatrical and complex pieces", resulting in "something that could appear in many a Broadway show" and with the music nicely capturing "the wide range of emotion that the narrative calls for." In fact, Sputnikmusic reviewer declared that "Dead Winter Dead really feels like a sort of heavier, more vocally-driven first Trans-Siberian Orchestra album", but also "true to metal form with plenty of aggressive vocals and fast, heavy riffs" establishing "war as the predominant atmosphere." Martin Popoff in his review for The Collector's Guide to Heavy Metal wrote that Dead Winter Dead is simply "a great piece of theatre, elegant, expressive, guitar-driven storytelling of the highest order", making "one of the most forceful concept records going, not so much sad as it might have been, but imposing."

== Track listing ==
All tracks are written by Jon Oliva and Paul O'Neill, except where noted.

No.	Title	Length
1.	"Overture" (instrumental)	1:50
2.	"Sarajevo"	2:31
3.	"This Is the Time (1990)"	5:40
4.	"I Am"	4:32
5.	"Starlight"	5:38
6.	"Doesn't Matter Anyway"	3:47
7.	"This Isn't What We Meant"	4:12
8.	"Mozart and Madness" (instrumental)	5:01
9.	"Memory" (instrumental)	1:19
10.	"Dead Winter Dead"	4:18
11.	"One Child"	5:14
12.	"Christmas Eve (Sarajevo 12/24)" (J. Oliva, O'Neill, Robert Kinkel, instrumental)	3:24
13.	"Not What You See"	5:02

2002 SPV CD reissue
No.	Title	Writer(s)	Length
14.	"All That I Bleed" (acoustic piano version)	Criss Oliva, J. Oliva, O'Neill	4:34
15.	"Sleep" (acoustic version)	C. Oliva, J. Oliva, O'Neill	3:46

2011 EarMusc CD reissue
No.	Title	Writer(s)	Length
14.	"Miles Away / Follow Me" (acoustic version)	C. Oliva, J. Oliva, O'Neill	5:47
15.	"When the Crowds Are Gone" (acoustic version)	C. Oliva, J. Oliva, O'Neill	6:24

== Personnel ==
Savatage

- Zachary Stevens – lead vocals
- Jon Oliva – keyboards, lead vocals on "I Am" and "Doesn't Matter Anyway", backing vocals on "Starlight", co–producer
- Al Pitrelli – guitar, backing vocals
- Chris Caffery – guitar, backing vocals
- Johnny Lee Middleton – bass guitar, backing vocals
- Jeff Plate – drums

Additional musicians

- Bob Kinkel – additional keyboards, engineer
- Mary Wooten – solo cello

Production

- Paul O'Neill – producer
- Ken Lewis, Julio Pena, Tim Hatfield, Joe Johnson, Mike Scielzi, Joe Daily, Chris Curran, Will Schillger, Brian Kinkead – additional engineering
- Steve Corson – assistant engineer
- Dave Whittman – mixing
- Ben Arrindell – mixing assistant
- Leon Zervos – mastering

== Charts ==
Year	Chart	Position
1995	Billboard Heatseekers Albums (US)	18
1995	Japanese Albums Chart	68
1995	German Albums Chart	80

2022 chart performance for Dead Winter Dead
Chart (2022)	Peak position
Swiss Albums (Schweizer Hitparade)	98
