= Gutter Ballet =

Studio album by Savatage
- Released: January 23, 1990
- Recorded: February–July 1989
- Studio: Record Plant in New York City
- Genre: Heavy metal; progressive metal
- Length: 52:25
- Label: Atlantic
- Producer: Paul O'Neill

Savatage chronology
Hall of the Mountain King (1987)	Gutter Ballet (1990)	Streets: A Rock Opera (1991)

Singles from Gutter Ballet
- 1. "Gutter Ballet" Released: 1990; 2. "When the Crowds Are Gone" Released: 1990

Professional ratings
Review scores
Source	Rating
AllMusic	4/5 stars
Collector's Guide to Heavy Metal	7/10
Rock Hard	10/10

Gutter Ballet is the fifth full-length album produced by the American heavy metal band Savatage. This was the second album created under the direction of producer Paul O'Neill and it was released on January 23, 1990.

== Overview ==
According to Metal Hammer: "This was power metal on a Broadway scale, not least on the title track’s orchestral overload."

This album was a true turning point for the band, as the sound transitioned from a heavy metal to experiment with a more progressive sound, which is reflected in songs such as "When the Crowds Are Gone" and "Gutter Ballet". During the final recording sessions, while Criss Oliva was tracking guitar solos, Paul O'Neil gave Jon Oliva tickets to see Andrew Lloyd Webber's musical The Phantom of the Opera on Broadway. Jon was so inspired that immediately following the performance, he went back to the studio and wrote the music for the title track. Gutter Ballet is not a concept album, but the final three songs ("Mentally Yours", "Summer's Rain", "Thorazine Shuffle") are a conceptual suite dealing with a single character as revealed by the band in interviews.

The original title for the record was Temptation Revelation, but this was changed to Hounds of Zaroff which was a Steve Wacholz suggestion. As late as May 1989, the eventual title track of the album had not been written and the band was having doubts surrounding the album title. The title Gutter Ballet finally came from that of a play producer Paul O'Neill had written ten years earlier and which would later make-up the majority of the band's next work, Streets. The song "Gutter Ballet" was written with just O'Neill, Jon and Criss Oliva in the studio. Jon's drumming skill was competent enough to perform on the track and he also provided the bass guitar duties for the track. Had the band originally stuck with the story set-out in Paul O'Neill's original 1979 story, the song "When the Crowds Are Gone" would have followed Streets track "A Little Too Far". Gutter Ballet was scheduled for release on October 20, 1989, but Atlantic Records delayed the album to January 23, 1990 due to production issues.

On the original cassette and CD releases, "Thorazine Shuffle" was a bonus track.

Two videos from the album entered rotation on MTV, "Gutter Ballet" (filmed at the beginning of 1990 in New York) and "When the Crowds Are Gone". The former track became a staple of Headbangers Ball and as a result, both Jon Oliva and Chris Caffery were invited to join host Riki Rachtman for an interview in 1990.

Many additional songs already written, before the decision of the change of style, were unused and subsequently published as bonus tracks, in the Sirens and The Dungeons Are Calling 2002 Silver reissues, some of them were also re-worked and published by Jon Oliva's Pain. Some titles were "Before I Hang", "Metal Head", "Target", "Livin on the Edge of Time", "Stranger In The Dark" and "Rap".

Paul O'Neill was planning a theatrical release under the Trans-Siberian Orchestra name, titled Gutter Ballet, including Savatage's music from this album and from Streets: A Rock Opera.

== Track listing ==
All tracks are written by Criss Oliva, Jon Oliva and Paul O'Neill, except "Silk and Steel" by C. Oliva and Paul Silver.

No.	Title	Length
1.	"Of Rage and War"	4:47
2.	"Gutter Ballet"	6:20
3.	"Temptation Revelation" (instrumental)	2:56
4.	"When the Crowds Are Gone"	5:45
5.	"Silk and Steel" (instrumental)	2:56
6.	"She's in Love"	3:51
7.	"Hounds"	6:27
8.	"The Unholy"	4:37
9.	"Mentally Yours"	5:19
10.	"Summer's Rain"	4:33
11.	"Thorazine Shuffle"	4:43

1997 Edel Music CD reissue
No.	Title	Length
12.	"All That I Bleed" (Piano version)	4:35

2002 SPV CD reissue
No.	Title	Length
12.	"Hounds" (live - taken from Ghost in the Ruins)	7:20
13.	"When the Crowds Are Gone" (live)	7:07

2011 EarMusic CD reissue
No.	Title	Length
12.	"Alone You Breathe" (acoustic version)	4:38
13.	"Handful of Rain" (acoustic version)	5:21

== Personnel ==
Savatage

- Jon Oliva – lead vocals, piano, keyboards, bass guitar and drums on "Gutter Ballet"
- Criss Oliva – guitars, acoustic guitar
- Johnny Lee Middleton – bass guitar
- Steve "Doc" Wacholz – drums

Chris Caffery does not appear on the album, but is credited with guitars and keyboards and is pictured in the album's liner notes "both to prepare the fans for the line-up they'd see on tour and confirm his permanent member status".

Additional musicians

- Robert Kinkel – keyboards
- John Dittmar, Stephen Daggett, Jerry Van Deilen, Dan Campbell – background shouts and laughs

Production

- Paul O'Neill – producer, arrangements with Savatage
- James A. Ball, Joe Henahan – engineers
- Teddy Trewalla, Deek Venarchick, Jay DeVito, Dave Parla – assistant engineers
- Dan Campbell – studio technician
- Jack Skinner – mastering at EuropaDisc, New York
- Gary Smith – cover art
- Dennis Osborne – photography

== Charts ==
Year	Chart	Position
1990	German Albums Chart	47
1990	Dutch MegaCharts	84
1990	Billboard 200 (US)	124

2022 chart performance for Gutter Ballet
Chart (2022)	Peak position
German Albums (Offizielle Top 100)	7
Swiss Albums (Schweizer Hitparade)	39
