= Hall of the Mountain King (album) =

Studio album by Savatage
- Released: September 28, 1987
- Studio: Record Plant (New York City)
- Genre: Heavy metal; power metal
- Length: 40:07
- Label: Atlantic
- Producer: Paul O'Neill; Savatage

Savatage chronology
Fight for the Rock (1986)	Hall of the Mountain King (1987)	Gutter Ballet (1990)

Singles from Hall of the Mountain King
- 1. "Hall of the Mountain King" Released: 1987; 2. "Strange Wings" Released: 1987

Professional ratings
Review scores
Source	Rating
AllMusic	4/5 stars
Collector's Guide to Heavy Metal	9/10
Metal Hammer (GER)	7/7
Rock Hard	8.5/10
Sea of Tranquility	4.5/5 stars

Hall of the Mountain King is the fourth studio album by the American heavy metal band Savatage, released in 1987 under the direction of producer Paul O'Neill. It is their first album produced by O'Neill, who was assigned to the band after the tour in support of Fight for the Rock. O'Neill's influence pushed Savatage to adopt a conceptual style beginning with this album.

"Prelude to Madness" is an arrangement of Grieg's "In the Hall of the Mountain King" from the Peer Gynt suite. Oddly, Grieg is not credited for this song, but for the following title track - which is an original song. The intro of "Prelude to Madness" features keyboards and guitar playing "Mars, the Bringer of War" from Gustav Holst's suite, The Planets. The song would be re-recorded by Trans-Siberian Orchestra in 2009 under the title of "The Mountain", appearing on that group's fifth studio album, Night Castle.

"This Is Where You Should Be", recorded during the studio sessions for this album, was not included; years later it was released on compilations and album reissues.

This was the first album to feature the album cover drawn by artist Gary Smith, who was responsible for lead guitarist Criss Oliva's airbrushed guitars at the time. Hall of the Mountain King reached position No. 116 in the US Billboard 200 albums chart.

In 2017 and 2019, respectively, Loudwire and Metal Hammer ranked it as the 22nd and 8th best power metal album of all time.

== Track listing ==
Side one
No.	Title	Writer(s)	Length
1.	"24 Hrs. Ago"	Jon Oliva, Criss Oliva, Johnny Lee Middleton, Paul O'Neill	4:56
2.	"Beyond the Doors of the Dark"	J. Oliva	5:07
3.	"Legions"	C. Oliva, J. Oliva	4:57
4.	"Strange Wings"	C. Oliva, J. Oliva, O'Neill	3:45

Side two
No.	Title	Writer(s)	Length
5.	"Prelude to Madness" (instrumental)	Edvard Grieg, C. Oliva, O'Neill	3:13
6.	"Hall of the Mountain King"	C. Oliva, J. Oliva, Middleton, O'Neill	5:35
7.	"The Price You Pay"	C. Oliva, J. Oliva, Steve Wacholz	3:51
8.	"White Witch"	C. Oliva, J. Oliva	3:21
9.	"Last Dawn" (instrumental)	C. Oliva	1:07
10.	"Devastation"	C. Oliva, J. Oliva	3:37

1997 Edel Music CD reissue
No.	Title	Writer(s)	Length
11.	"Stay" (acoustic)	C. Oliva, J. Oliva, O'Neill	2:48

2002 SPV CD reissue
No.	Title	Length
11.	"Hall of the Mountain King" (live)	6:00
12.	"Devastation" (live)	3:36

2011 EarMusic CD reissue
No.	Title	Writer(s)	Length
11.	"Castles Burning" (acoustic)	J. Oliva, O'Neill	4:04
12.	"Somewhere in Time / Alone You Breathe" (acoustic)	C. Oliva, J. Oliva, O'Neill	4:30

== Personnel ==
In the liner notes for the album, the band gave themselves roles instead of listing their instruments.

Savatage

- Jon Oliva – "The Grit" (lead vocals, piano)
- Criss Oliva – "The Crunch" (guitars)
- Johnny Lee Middleton – "The Thunder" (bass guitar, backing vocals)
- Steve Wacholz – "Doctor Killdrums" (drums, percussion)

Additional musicians

- Robert Kinkel – keyboards
- Ray Gillen – backing vocals on "Strange Wings"
- Chris Caffery – guitars (touring member only)

Production

- Paul O'Neill – producer, arrangements
- Savatage – co-producer, arrangements
- Roy Cicala, Nick Schiralli – recording, mixing at Record Plant, New York
- James A. Ball – engineer
- Joe Henahan – assistant engineer
- Jack Skinner – mastering at Sterling Sound, New York
- Gary Smith – Illustration
- Savatage, Bob Defrin – art direction
- Robert Zemsky – direction
- R. Z. management Inc. – management

== Charts ==
Chart performance for Hall of the Mountain King
Chart (1987)	Peak position
US Billboard 200	116

Chart (2022)	Peak position
German Albums (Offizielle Top 100)	26
Swiss Albums (Schweizer Hitparade)	48
