= Johnny Lee Middleton =

American bassist (born 1963)

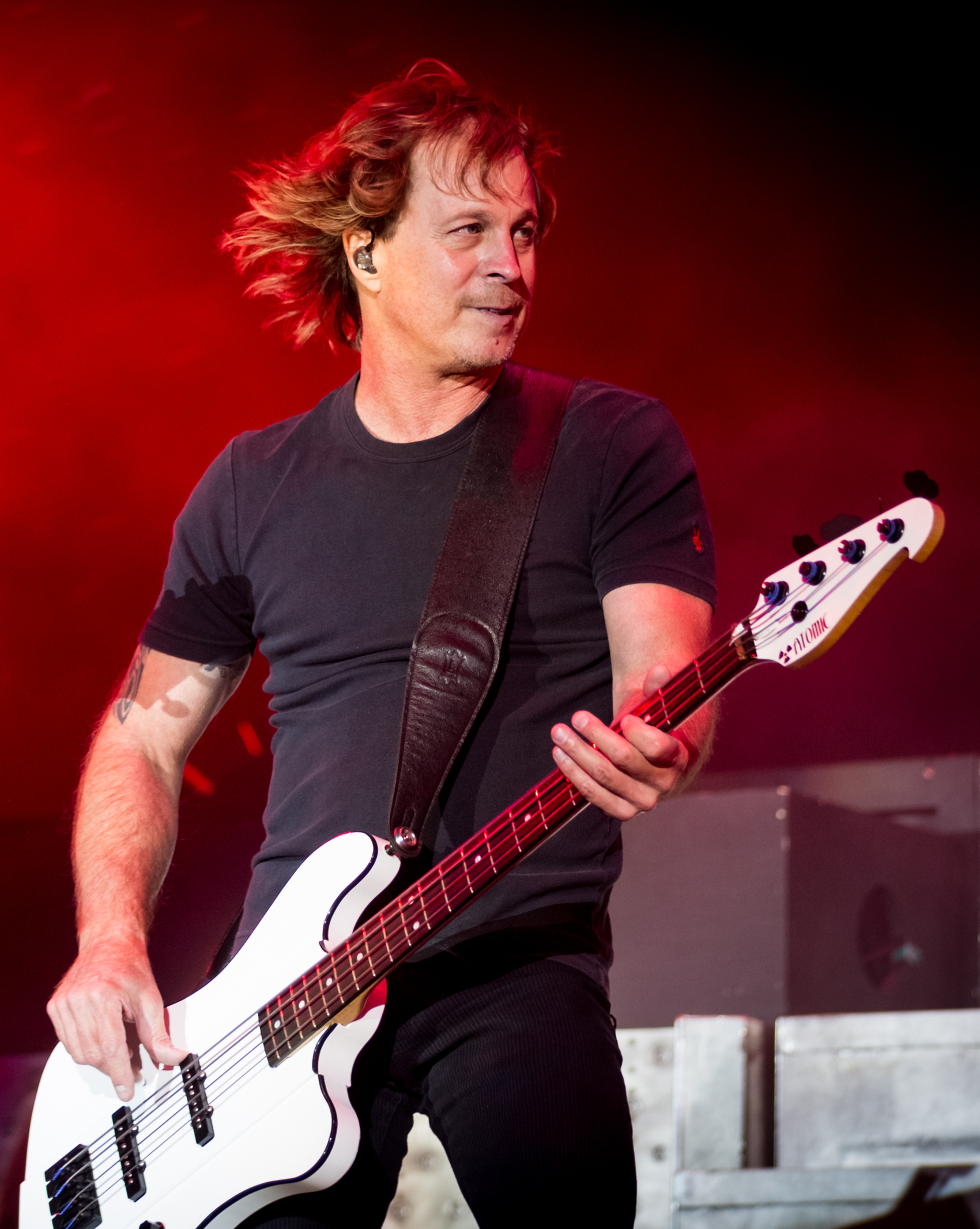
- Middleton with Savatage in 2015

Background information
- Born: John Lee Middleton III; May 7, 1963 (age 62); St. Petersburg, Florida, U.S.
- Genres: Heavy metal; progressive metal; power metal; glam metal (early)
- Occupations: Musician; songwriter
- Instrument: Bass guitar
- Member of: Savatage, Trans-Siberian Orchestra
- Website: johnnyleemiddleton.com

Johnny Lee Middleton (born May 7, 1963) is an American musician, best known as the bass guitarist for the heavy metal bands Savatage and Trans-Siberian Orchestra.

== Musical beginnings ==
Middleton was born in St. Petersburg, Florida. His first experience as a performing musician was as first-chair trumpet in the sixth-grade orchestra. The band director provided early encouragement. "I'd get free lessons from him, so I learned how to play the saxophone, the clarinet, [and] the oboe. He kind of gave me an ear for music."

As a bass player, however, Middleton is largely self-taught. At age 14, he joined the high-school jazz band. With the bass rig behind him, he quickly discovered "the way the bass moves the earth" – and just as quickly realized "you could get more girls by playing bass instead of trumpet." He invested $35 in his first bass, locked himself in his bedroom with REO Speedwagon, Cheap Trick, and Black Sabbath records, and learned to play along. Among his influences, Middleton counts Black Sabbath's Geezer Butler, Phil Lynott (Thin Lizzy), Geddy Lee (Rush), Chris Squire (Yes), John Entwistle (the Who), and Paul McCartney (the Beatles).

Another influential experience – also at age 14 – was his first concert: Blue Öyster Cult. Middleton left the show knowing he wanted to be a professional bass player. "After that first concert, I was hooked. I was like, 'I want to be up there. I want to do that.'"

Later in high school, Middleton and two friends formed his first band, Mariah. The trio performed regularly at high-school parties and other events. After graduation, Middleton played in several local bands before joining Lefty, a glam band that was already fairly well known on the Florida club circuit. Middleton soon found himself onstage nearly every night, decked out in makeup and spandex, playing to packed clubs across Florida and the South. "We got a lot of stage experience," he says. "We did a lot of covers, and some original. We were like a Poison before Poison. Everyone had bleached blonde hair, and wore a lot of makeup and hairspray. We were bizarre, but we would pack the clubs."

== Savatage ==
Middleton spent several years with Lefty, the nightly shows honing both his bass chops and his stage presence. And it was during this time that he first crossed paths with Savatage, a decidedly un-glam metal band based in the Tampa, Florida area, near his hometown of St. Petersburg.

By 1984, Savatage had released several albums, but guitarist Criss Oliva and drummer Steve Wacholz were losing patience with bass player Keith Collins. That year, Wacholz spotted Middleton onstage with Lefty at a local club. Although the Lefty image was a far cry from that of the hard-edged Savatage, Middleton's talent and stage presence caught Wacholz' attention. Wacholz passed Middleton's name to Savatage founder and singer Jon Oliva. Like Wacholz, Oliva had little interest in the Lefty look, but he too was impressed with Middleton's performance.

When invited to join Savatage, however, Middleton turned the offer down. The members of Savatage all worked other jobs, and Middleton's Lefty gig paid well enough to live on without the need for outside work. "Steve [Wacholz] approached me and offered me the bass gig. I said, 'I'm not going to [work] a day job – I'm making $250 a week.' For me, being 19-20 years old, that was good money. I said, 'When you can offer me a salary, come back and see me.'"

But eventually, playing cover songs with Lefty lost its appeal. "We did well, but it got old," Middleton says. Late in 1985, Savatage approached Middleton again. Preparing to record their next album, they were still looking to replace Collins. This time, Middleton agreed: "Somehow I was fed up with this bar-band-shit, even though it was a good living, getting through the week with $250, even if it meant we had to work each night for it. At the time I was only 20, 21 years old. The guys from my band would have loved to have lynched me, when I stepped out. Four weeks later I couldn't have cared less. I was in London with Savatage – and had a fuckin' great time!"

Middleton's first appearance on a Savatage recording was 1986's Fight for the Rock, an album the band now refers to as "Fight for the Nightmare." "We recorded a great record," he says, but the record label "took our record, mangled the hell out of it, and tried to make us into something we weren't, when they thought the market was going more poppy. It was a learning experience." The experience improved with 1987's breakthrough Hall of the Mountain King, which marked the band's first collaboration with producer Paul O'Neill. The title track received significant airplay on hard-rock radio and MTV's Headbanger's Ball. Gutter Ballet (1990) and Streets (1991) continued and solidified the partnership with O'Neill. During this time, Savatage embarked on several American and European tours, opening for bands such as Motörhead, Dio, and Megadeth.

1993 saw the first significant change in the Savatage lineup since Middleton's arrival in 1985. Singer Jon Oliva departed, and the remaining members of Savatage recorded and released Edge of Thorns with new vocalist Zak Stevens. Middleton describes Edge of Thorns as "about my favorite record, due to the fact that I like the bass mix in it, and it was the last one me and Criss got to do together. Jon had stepped down to pursue his Broadway thing, and it was me and Criss against the world, really. Everything was against us, and we fought back and won."

The victory was short-lived. On October 17, 1993, Criss Oliva's car was struck head-on by a drunk driver. Oliva was killed instantly.

Middleton did not play on 1994's Handful of Rain. He entered the studio, saw Criss Oliva's signature white guitar, and – still devastated by Oliva's death only months before – turned around and walked out. But he joined the reunited and rebuilt Savatage for the Handful of Rain tour, and in early 1995 he rejoined the band in the studio to record their ninth album Dead Winter Dead, and has remained in Savatage since then.

== Trans-Siberian Orchestra ==
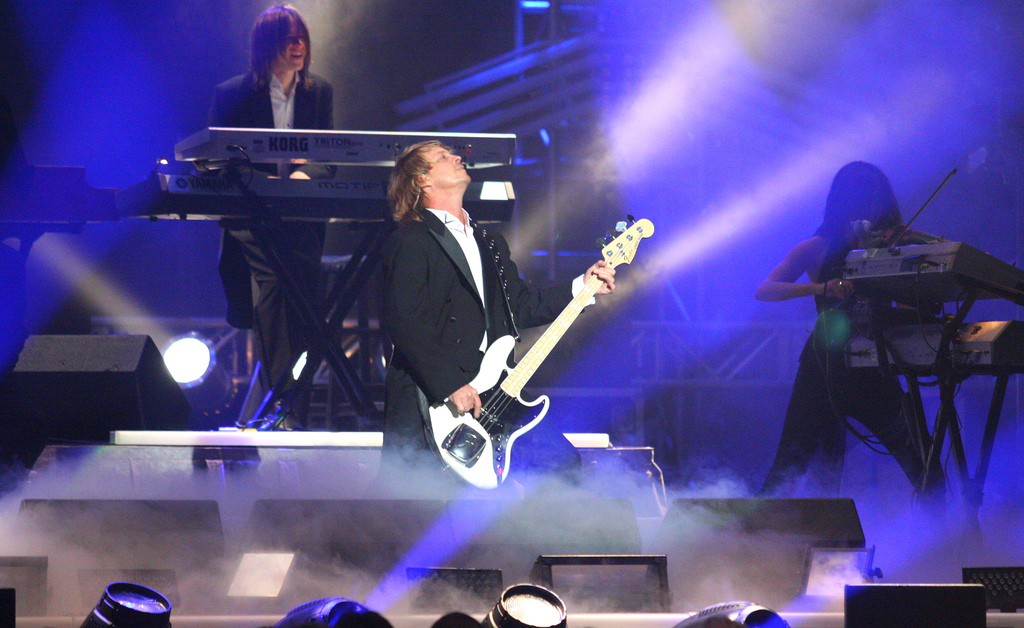
Middleton with Trans-Siberian Orchestra in 2007

Among the tracks on Dead Winter Dead was "Christmas Eve (Sarajevo 12/24)", an instrumental medley of the Christmas standards "Carol of the Bells" and "God Rest Ye Merry Gentlemen," featuring a string orchestra alongside the electric guitars. In late 1995, "Christmas Eve" was released as a single to hundreds of radio stations across the United States. Station managers – intimidated by the Savatage name, the band believes – largely ignored it.

The Savatage-branded "Christmas Eve" made it on the air in only a few markets that year. But in those markets it garnered an impressive response – so impressive that producer O'Neill decided to build an entirely new project upon the song's larger-than-life combination of hard-rock music and classical arrangements. In the summer of 1996, the members of Savatage, including Middleton, returned to the studio with O'Neill. The band recorded Christmas Eve and Other Stories, a concept album which told the story of an angel descending to earth to search for the true meaning of Christmas.

In late 1996, an unknown group called Trans-Siberian Orchestra released their first single, "Christmas Eve/Sarajevo 12/24," to more than 300 radio stations across the United States. Very few station managers had any idea that the same song had landed on their desks the year before. Even fewer knew that the new Trans-Siberian Orchestra was, in fact, essentially an extension of Savatage. "Christmas Eve" hit the airwaves, and the phone lines lit up nationwide.

Largely on the strength of that song, Christmas Eve and Other Stories has since sold nearly 3 million copies and launched the TSO empire. Since 1996, TSO has released four more albums – The Christmas Attic (1998), Beethoven's Last Night (2000), The Lost Christmas Eve (2004), and Night Castle (2009) – all of which feature Middleton on bass. Together, they have sold nearly 4 million copies.

Middleton has also performed with TSO's annual holiday tour since its inception. In 2008 alone, the two Trans-Siberian Orchestra touring companies combined played nearly 150 shows for over 1 million people. Savatage started Trans Siberian Orchestra because of some issues and difficulties.

== Solo project ==
In early 2008, Middleton began to try his hand at making music on his own. He soon discovered that songwriting "was like opening up another side of my mind that I never knew existed." He took several raw tracks to singer and long time friend John Haikara who added lyrics, vocals and lead guitar. The tracks were then mixed by Jim Morris at Tampa, Florida, famed Morrisound Studios. Drums were added by Mike Dillon veteran Tampa Bay rocker. His first two solo singles, "Tennessee" and "Broken Wings," were released in late 2008.

== Discography ==
=== Savatage ===
- Fight for the Rock (1986)
- Hall of the Mountain King (1987)
- Gutter Ballet (1990)
- Streets: A Rock Opera (1991)
- Edge of Thorns (1993)
- Handful of Rain (1994) (credited, but does not play)
- Dead Winter Dead (1995)
- The Wake of Magellan (1997)
- Poets and Madmen (2001)

=== Trans-Siberian Orchestra ===
- Christmas Eve and Other Stories (1996)
- The Christmas Attic (1998)
- Beethoven's Last Night (2000)
- The Lost Christmas Eve (2004)
- Night Castle (2009)
- Letters From the Labyrinth (2015)
