= Steve Wacholz =

American heavy metal drummer (born 1962)

Steve "Doc" Wacholz
- Born: Steve Wacholz; November 5, 1962 (age 63); White Plains, New York, U.S.
- Genres: Heavy metal; progressive metal; power metal; thrash metal
- Occupations: Musician, songwriter
- Instruments: Drums, percussion
- Years active: 1977-present
- Member of: Reverence
- Formerly of: Savatage, Crimson Glory

Steve Wacholz (born November 5, 1962) is an American heavy metal drummer. He is best known as the drummer of Savatage from 1977 and 1979–1994. His hard-hitting playing style earned him the nickname "Doctor Hardware Killdrums" (simply "Doc") by his bandmates, as he was known for using a large three kick drumset and extra large 3S drumsticks.

== Biography ==
Wacholz was born in White Plains, New York

Steve "Doc" Wacholz met Criss Oliva when he was 14 years old in Tampa Bay Florida. In 1979, Steve Wacholz joined the Oliva brothers band Avatar and jammed in a shack behind the Oliva home that was dubbed "The Pit" by the band. Wacholz originally had tried out to be part of Criss' older brother Jon Oliva's band, Alien, but when the first Savatage line-up was taking shape in 1977, Jon, who was originally on drum duties, was relieved of them by Wacholz.[3] They also gave Steve a nickname that would follow him throughout his career: "Doctor Hardware Killdrums", often shortened to just "Doc" or "Doc Killdrums", which referred to Steve's hard playing style.

== Leaving Savatage ==
In 1993 Wacholz played on the Edge of Thorns album, but could not join the tour because of personal reasons. Following the Edge of Thorns Tour, while away in 1993, his bandmate Criss Oliva was driving with his wife, Dawn, on their way to the Fourth Annual Livestock Festival held in Zephyrhills, Florida. An oncoming car operated by a drunk driver crossed the median and struck Oliva's 1982 Mazda RX-7 head-on, killing him instantly. After this, Wacholz decided not to return to Savatage citing Oliva's death as his reason to retire from the band. "My choice NOT to be in SAVATAGE today has something to do with his passing...it will never be the same... it can never be the same...but his music lives on thru his brother & Chris Caffery who has the essence of Criss in him. YES I believe that. I realize God took him out but please, God, bless those guys...And may God bless Criss, friend, musician and probably one of the nicest guys you would ever want to have memories about! And I have those and I am thankful!"

== Later career ==
In 1999, Steve was credited as a drummer for Crimson Glory's Astronomica, but did not play on the album. Currently, Wacholz is a member of the band Reverence which also includes ex Tokyo Blade guitarist Bryan Holland. He owns Cherokee Guns, a gun store in Murphy, North Carolina. His gun store has been in the news due to his political marketing of his gun store.

== Music videos ==
Throughout the late 80s to the early 90s Steve "Doc" Wacholz appeared in all the Savatage Music videos from 87–91 in addition...Steve has carried on with Michigan-based metal band Reverence.

=== Hall of the Mountain King (1987) ===
- "Hall of the Mountain King"
- "24 Hours Ago"

=== Gutter Ballet (1990) ===
- "Gutter Ballet"
- "When the Crowds are Gone"

=== Streets: A Rock Opera (1991) ===
- "Jesus Saves"

=== Edge of Thorns (1993) ===
- "Edge of Thorns"

=== Handful Of Rain (1994) ===
- "Handful Of Rain"

=== Reverence - When Darkness Calls (2012) ===
- "Too Late"
- "Bleed For Me"
- "After The Leaves Have Fallen"

=== Reverence - Gods of war (2015) ===
- "Gods Of War"
- "Until My Dying Breath"
- "Race To Obscene"

=== Reverence - (2021) ===
- "Kill The King" (Rainbow cover - not released on an album.)
