= Blackmore's Night discography =

- Studio albums: 11
- Live albums: 3
- Compilation albums: 6
- Singles: 11
- Music videos: 14

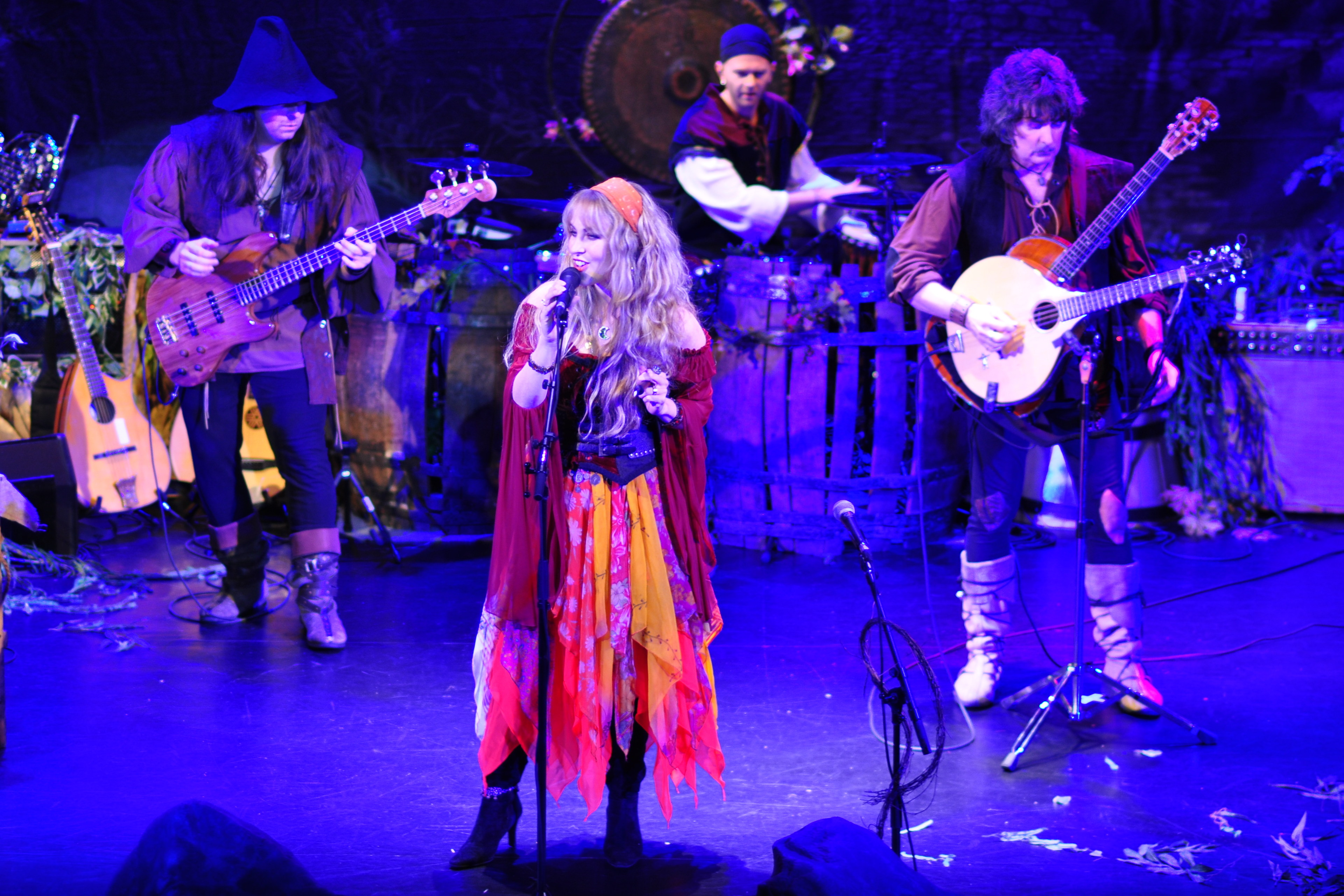
Blackmore's Night live in concert at the Tarrytown Music Hall, October 25, 2012

Over the years, Blackmore's Night have released 11 studio albums, 11 commercial singles, 3 live albums and 6 compilation albums.

== Albums ==
=== Studio albums ===
List of studio albums, with selected chart positions
Title	Album details	Peak chart positions								
Title	Album details	UK	AUT	GER	SWI	SWE	FIN	NLD	JPN	US
Shadow of the Moon	Released: 2 June 1997; Label: Edel	—	75	16	74	—	—	—	11	―
Under a Violet Moon	Released: 13 July 1999; Label: Edel	—	—	20	—	—	—	—	13	―
Fires at Midnight	Released: 10 July 2001; Label: SPV	138	32	9	81	—	—	—	20	―
Ghost of a Rose	Released: 17 June 2003; Label: SPV	—	—	11	75	39	—	—	77	―
The Village Lanterne	Released: 4 April 2006; Label: SPV	—	—	13	67	52	33	—	32	―
Winter Carols	Released: 7 November 2006; Label: AFM/Locomotive	—	—	74	—	—	—	—	56	―
Secret Voyage	Released: 15 July 2008; Label: SPV	194	40	14	67	44	38	95	—	—
Autumn Sky	Released: 10 September 2010; Label: Ariola/Spinefarm	—	43	15	57	36	29	—	50	―
Dancer and the Moon	Released: 11 June 2013; Label: Frontiers	83	39	13	40	22	31	—	41	189
All Our Yesterdays	Released: 18 September 2015; Label: Frontiers	94	48	19	64	―	39	48	62	―
Nature's Light	Released: 12 March 2021; Label: Edel	―	14	7	22	10	―	―	60	―
"—" denotes releases that did not chart.

=== Live albums ===
Year	Album details	Charts	
Year	Album details	GER	JPN
2002	Past Times with Good Company: Released: October 2002; Label: SPV; Format:	62	95
2007	Paris Moon: Released: 6 November 2007; Label: SPV; Format:	75	—
2012	A Knight In York: Released: 2012; Label: Ariola/UDR Music; Format:	8	—

=== Compilation albums ===
Year	Album details
2001	Minstrels And Ballads: Released: 19 September 2001; Label: Canyon International; Format: CD
2003	The Best Of: Released: 2003; Label: Edel Records; Format: CD
2004	Beyond the Sunset: The Romantic Collection: Released: 14 September 2004; Label: SPV; Format: CD
2004	All For One – The Finest Collection Of Blackmore's Night: Released: 1 September 2004; Label: Yamaha Music Communications; Format: CD
2012	The Beginning: Released: 12 December 2012; Label: UDR; Format: CD
2017	To the Moon and Back: 20 Years and Beyond: Released: 11 August 2017; Label: Minstrel Hall Music; Format: CD

== Singles ==
Year	Title	Charts	Album	
Year	Title	GER	Album	
1997	"Shadow of the Moon"	—	Shadow of the Moon	
1997	"No Second Chance"	—	Shadow of the Moon	
1997	"Wish You Were Here"	—	Shadow of the Moon	
2001	"The Times They Are a Changin'"	—	Fires at Midnight	
2003	"Home Again"	—	Fires at Midnight	
2003	"Way to Mandalay"	—	Ghost of a Rose	
2004	"All Because of You"	—	Fires at Midnight	
2005	"I'll Be There (Just Call My Name)"	92	The Village Lanterne	
2006	"Christmas Eve"	—	Christmas Songs	
2006	"Olde Mill Inn"	—	The Village Lanterne	
2006	"Streets of London"	—	The Village Lanterne	
2006	"Hark the Herald Angels Sing"	—	Winter Carols	
2008	"Can't Help Falling in Love"	—	Secret Voyage	
2010	"Highland"	—	Autumn Sky	
2010	"Journeyman"	—	Autumn Sky	
2013	"The Moon is Shining (Somewhere Over the Sea)"	—	Dancer and the Moon	
2013	"Dancer and the Moon"	—	Dancer and the Moon	
2015	"All Our Yesterdays"	—	All Our Yesterday'	
2015	"Will O' The Wisp"	—	All Our Yesterday'	
2020	"Here We Come A-Caroling" (EP)	—	N/A	—
2023	"Play Minstrel Play (25th Anniversary New Mix) feat. Ian Anderson/Greensleeves (25th Anniversary New Mix) " (EP)	—	N/A	

== Live DVDs ==
Year	Album details	Peak chart positions					
Year	Album details	UK	AUT	GER	SWE	ITA	JPN
2005	Castles and Dreams: Released: 30 May 2005; Label: SPV; Format:	23	4	3	2	8	65
2007	Paris Moon: Released: 6 November 2007; Label: SPV; Format:	26	—	—	10	—	120
2012	A Knight In York: Released: 2012; Label: Ariola/UDR Music; Format:	—	—	2	—	—	92
2012	The Beginning: Released: 2012; Label: EMI/Caroline; Format:	—	—	—	—	—	—

== Music videos ==
- Shadow of the Moon (1997)
- No Second Chance (1997)
- Renaissance Faire (1997)
- The Times They Are a Changin' (2001)
- Hanging Tree (2001)
- Way to Mandalay (2003)
- Christmas Eve (English Version) (2005)
- Christmas Eve (German Version) (2005)
- Once in a Million Years (2005)
- Village Lanterne (2006)
- Olde Mill Inn (2006)
- Locked Within the Crystal Ball (2008)
- Highland (2010)
- Dancer and the Moon (2013)
- The Moon is Shining (Somewhere Over the Sea) (2013)
- Christmas Eve (2013 Version) (2014)
- All Our Yesterdays (2015)
- Will O' The Wisp (2015)
- Second Element (2021)

== Live VHS ==
- Shadow of the Moon – Live in Germany 1997–1998 (1999)
- Under a Violet Moon – Castle Tour 2000 (2002)
