= Beyond the Sunset: The Romantic Collection =

Beyond the Sunset

Compilation album by Blackmore's Night
- Released: 2004
- Genres: folk rock; neo-Medieval
- Length: 58:41
- Label: Steamhammer
- Producer: Ritchie Blackmore

Blackmore's Night chronology
Ghost of a Rose (2003)	Beyond the Sunset (2004)	Castles and Dreams (2005)

Professional ratings
Review scores
Source	Rating
AllMusic	4/5 stars
Metal Storm	(favorable)

Beyond the Sunset is a Blackmore's Night compilation album released in 2004 through Steamhammer. It is named after the song "Beyond the Sunset" by Blackmore's Night from their 1999 album Under a Violet Moon. This compilation was derived from their four studio albums released at that point except for one previously unreleased track; "Once In A Million Years", and also contains two re-recorded tracks: "Ghost of a Rose" and "Now and Then".

The album won the New Age Reporter Lifestyle Music Award as the Best Vocal Album.

== Track listing ==
Songs are by Ritchie Blackmore and Candice Night, except where noted.

=== Disc 1 ===
1. "Once in a Million Years" [Wenn aus Liebe Sehnsucht wird] – 4:33
2. "Be Mine Tonight" – 2:55
3. "Wish You Were Here" (Teijo) – 5:06
4. "Waiting Just for You" (Blackmore, Clark, Night) – 3:18
5. "Durch den Wald zum Bach Haus" (Blackmore) – 2:35 (instrumental)
6. "Ghost of a Rose" – 5:43 (new version)
7. "Spirit of the Sea" – 4:53
8. "I Still Remember" – 5:42
9. "Castles and Dreams" – 3:36
10. "Beyond the Sunset" (Blackmore) – 3:47 (instrumental)
11. "Again Someday" – 1:43
12. "Diamonds and Rust" (Baez) – 4:54
13. "Now and Then" (Night) – 3:15 (new version)
14. "All Because of You" – 3:34

=== Disc 2 ===
1. "Written in the Stars" – 4:49
2. "Morning Star" – 4:41
3. "Play Minstrel Play" (trad., Blackmore, Night) – 3:59
4. "Minstrel Hall" (Blackmore) – 2:36 (instrumental)
5. "Under a Violet Moon" – 4:23
- Disc 1; track 1 was previously unreleased.
- Disc 1; tracks 2, 3, and 7; and Disc 2; tracks 3 and 4, are taken from Shadow of the Moon (1997).
- Disc 1; tracks 5, 9, 10, and 13; and Disc 2; tracks 2 and 5, are taken from Under a Violet Moon (1999).
- Disc 1; tracks 4, 8, 11, and 14; and Disc 2; track 1, are taken from Fires at Midnight (2001).
- Disc 1; tracks 6 and 12 are taken from Ghost of a Rose (2003).
