= Winter Carols =

Studio album by Blackmore's Night
- Released: October 2006
- Recorded: 2006
- Genres: folk rock, neo-medieval, Christmas music
- Length: 42:35
- Labels: AFM Records (Germany); Locomotive Music (US)
- Producer: Pat Regan

Blackmore's Night chronology
The Village Lanterne (2006)	Winter Carols (2006)	Paris Moon (2007)

Professional ratings
Review scores
Source	Rating
Allmusic	3.5/5 stars
Metal Storm	(7.4/10)

Winter Carols is the sixth studio album by the group Blackmore's Night, released in the United Kingdom in October 2006, and in the United States on November 7, 2006. It is a Christmas themed album. The cover artwork for this album, painted by Karsten Topelmann, is an adaptation of a street in Rothenburg ob der Tauber, Germany, in line with the band's heavy Renaissance influence. The same street is portrayed in the cover of Blackmore's Night's second studio album, Under a Violet Moon. In the cover of "Winter Carols" the street is painted as winter time, whereas Under a Violet Moon's cover takes place on apparently a summer night. While the selection "Winter (Basse Dance)" is credited to Ritchie Blackmore as composer, the first phrase comes from Gaspar Sanz's "Espanoleta" (written in 1674, this piece is familiar today from its adaptation by Joaquin Rodrigo for the second movement of his "Fantasía para un gentilhombre", which he composed for classical guitar virtuoso Andres Segovia in 1954) though Blackmore quickly goes off on his own from there. The songs no longer under copyright are credited only as "trad.[itional]" even when the authors are known.

In December 2006, Winter Carols entered at #7 on USA Billboard New Age Charts.

The album won the New Age Reporter Lifestyle Music Award as the Best Holiday Album.

== Track listing ==
No.	Title	Writer(s)	Length
1.	"Hark the Herald Angels Sing / Come All Ye Faithful"	trad.	3:48
2.	"I Saw Three Ships"	trad.	2:39
3.	"Winter (Basse Dance)"	Ritchie Blackmore	3:08
4.	"Ding Dong Merrily on High"	trad.	3:15
5.	"Ma-O-Tzur"	trad.	2:20
6.	"Good King Wenceslas"	trad.	4:45
7.	"Lord of the Dance / Simple Gifts"	Sydney Carter / Joseph Brackett	3:33
8.	"We Three Kings"	trad.	4:48
9.	"Wish You Were Here" (song from Shadow of the Moon)	Leskelä Teijo	5:04
10.	"Emmanuel"	trad.	3:30
11.	"Christmas Eve"	Blackmore, Candice Night	4:20
12.	"We Wish You a Merry Christmas"	trad.	1:25

== 2013 Reissue ==
The album was re-issued in 2013 with an additional CD of live versions, along with that year's single – a reworking of the track Christmas Eve.

No.	Title	Writer(s)	Length
1.	"Hark the Herald Angels Sing / Come All Ye Faithful - Live from Minstrel Hall 2013"	trad.	4:12
2.	"Emmanuel – Live from Minstrel Hall 2013"	trad.	4:35
3.	"We Three Kings – Live from Minstrel Hall 2013"	trad.	5:26
4.	"Ma-O-Tzur – Live from Minstrel Hall 2013"	trad.	5:26
5.	"Good King Wenceslas – Live from Minstrel Hall 2013"	trad.	6:13
6.	"Christmas Eve – 2013 Version"	Blackmore, Candice Night	4:33
7.	"Christmas Eve – German Radio Edit"	Blackmore, Candice Night	3:56
8.	"Christmas Eve – English & German Radio Edit"	Blackmore, Candice Night	3:56
9.	"Christmas Eve – English Radio Edit"	Blackmore, Candice Night	3:56
10.	"Christmas Eve – Video"	Blackmore, Candice Night

== 2017 Reissue ==
=== Disc 1 ===
No.	Title	Writer(s)	Length
1.	"Deck the Halls" (2017 New recording)	trad.	2:45
2.	"God Rest Ye Merry Gentlemen" (2017 New recording)	trad.	4:33
3.	"Oh Christmas Tree" (2017 New recording)	trad.	4:54
4.	"Hark the Herald Angels Sing / Come All Ye Faithful"	trad.	3:50
5.	"I Saw Three Ships"	trad.	2:40
6.	"Winter (Basse Dance)"	Ritchie Blackmore	3:07
7.	"Ding Dong Merrily on High"	trad.	3:16
8.	"Ma-O-Tzur"	trad.	2:19
9.	"Good King Wenceslas"	trad.	4:44
10.	"Lord of the Dance / Simple Gifts"	Sydney Carter / Joseph Brackett	3:34
11.	"We Three Kings"	trad.	4:48
12.	"Wish You Were Here" (song from Shadow of the Moon)	Leskelä Teijo	5:02
13.	"Emmanuel"	trad.	3:32
14.	"Christmas Eve"	Blackmore, Candice Night	4:20
15.	"We Wish You a Merry Christmas"	trad.	1:21

=== Disc 2 ===
No.	Title	Writer(s)	Length
1.	"Hark the Herald Angels Sing / Come All Ye Faithful – Live from Minstrel Hall 2013"	trad.	4:12
2.	"Emmanuel – Live from Minstrel Hall 2013"	trad.	4:35
3.	"We Three Kings – Live from Minstrel Hall 2013"	trad.	5:26
4.	"Ma-O-Tzur – Live from Minstrel Hall 2013"	trad.	5:26
5.	"Good King Wenceslas – Live from Minstrel Hall 2013"	trad.	6:13
6.	"Christmas Eve – 2013 Version"	Blackmore, Candice Night	4:33
7.	"Christmas Eve – German Radio Edit"	Blackmore, Candice Night	3:56
8.	"Christmas Eve – English & German Radio Edit"	Blackmore, Candice Night	3:56
9.	"Christmas Eve – English Radio Edit"	Blackmore, Candice Night	3:56
10.	"Christmas Eve – Video"	Blackmore, Candice Night

== 2021 Edition ==
=== Disc 1 ===
No.	Title	Writer(s)	Length
1.	"Coventry Carol" (2021 New recording)	trad.	3:07
2.	"Deck the Halls"	trad.	2:45
3.	"God Rest Ye Merry Gentlemen"	trad.	4:33
4.	"Oh Christmas Tree"	trad.	4:54
5.	"Hark the Herald Angels Sing / Come All Ye Faithful"	trad.	3:50
6.	"I Saw Three Ships"	trad.	2:40
7.	"Winter (Basse Dance)"	Ritchie Blackmore	3:07
8.	"Ding Dong Merrily on High"	trad.	3:16
9.	"Ma-O-Tzur"	trad.	2:19
10.	"Good King Wenceslas"	trad.	4:44
11.	"Lord of the Dance / Simple Gifts"	Sydney Carter / Joseph Brackett	3:34
12.	"We Three Kings"	trad.	4:48
13.	"Wish You Were Here (2021)" (song from Shadow of the Moon)	Leskelä Teijo	5:01
14.	"Emmanuel"	trad.	3:32
15.	"Christmas Eve"	Blackmore, Candice Night	4:20
16.	"We Wish You a Merry Christmas"	trad.	1:21

=== Disc 2 ===
No.	Title	Writer(s)	Length
1.	"Crowning of the King" (song from Fires at Midnight)	trad.	4:26
2.	"Here We Come A-Caroling"	trad.	2:20
3.	"It Came Upon a Midnight Clear"	trad.	1:58
4.	"O Little Town of Bethlehem"	trad.	3:16
5.	"Silent Night"	trad.	2:38
6.	"Christmas Eve (2013 Version)"	Blackmore, Candice Night	4:33
7.	"Hark the Herald Angels Sing / Come All Ye Faithful (Live from Minstal Hall 2013)"	trad.	4:12
8.	"Emmanuel (Live from Minstrel Hall 2013)"	trad.	4:35
9.	"We Three Kings (Live from Minstrel Hall 2013)"	trad.	5:26
10.	"Ma-O-Tzur (Live from Minstrel Hall 2013)"	trad.	5:26
11.	"Good King Wenceslas (Live from Minstrel Hall 2013)"	trad.	6:13

== Personnel ==
- Ritchie Blackmore – arrangements, guitar, mandola, nyckelharpa, hurdy-gurdy, percussion
- Candice Night – vocals, shawm, pennywhistle
- Pat Regan – production, arrangements, keyboards
- Sir Robert of Normandie (Robert Curiano) – bass
- Sisters of the Moon: Lady Madeline and Lady Nancy (Madeline and Nancy Posner) – harmony vocals
- Bard David of Larchmont (David Baranowski) – keyboards
- Sarah Steiding – violin
- Anton Fig – drums
- Albert Dannemann – bagpipes, backing vocals
- Ian Robertson and Jim Manngard – backing vocals

== Charts ==
Chart (2006)	Peak position
German Albums (Offizielle Top 100)	74
Japanese Albums (Oricon)	56
UK Independent Albums (Official Charts)	40
