= Past Times with Good Company =

Live album by Blackmore's Night
- Released: October 22, 2002 (Germany); February 20, 2003 (US)
- Recorded: May 3, 2002
- Genres: folk rock; neo-Medieval
- Length: 1:49:28
- Label: SPV/Steamhammer
- Producer: Ritchie Blackmore

Blackmore's Night chronology
Fires at Midnight (2001)	Past Times with Good Company (2002)	Ghost of a Rose (2003)

For the English folk song written by King Henry VIII, see Pastime with Good Company.

Professional ratings
Review scores
Source	Rating
AllMusic	3/5 stars

Past Times with Good Company is a double live album by the band Blackmore's Night, recorded in May 2002 in Groningen, the Netherlands. It was released in October 2002 in Europe and in February 2003 in the US and Canada. The European version includes a Greek rendition of "Home Again" and extra live tracks recorded at a press show in Solingen, Germany. CD 2 of the special Limited Edition leather-bound hard-cover package includes two bonus tracks: an acoustic "Fires At Midnight" and "Home Again" sung in Greek. The album's title is a homage to the 16th century English folk song "Pastime with Good Company", composed by King Henry VIII, and performed in a special 2-part arrangement by Blackmore's Night on this recording. "Fires At Midnight" is another piece with a royal lineage, attributed to King Alphonso X of Spain.

== Track listing ==
Disc one
No.	Title	Length
1.	"Shadow of the Moon"	10:56
2.	"Play Minstrel Play"	4:34
3.	"Minstrel Hall"	5:43
4.	"Past Time with Good Company"	7:04
5.	"Fires at Midnight"	12:28
6.	"Under a Violet Moon"	5:01
7.	"Soldier of Fortune"	4:21

Disc two
No.	Title	Length
8.	"16th Century Greensleeves"	4:44
9.	"Beyond the Sunset"	5:28
10.	"Morning Star"	6:09
11.	"Home Again"	6:32
12.	"Renaissance Faire"	5:07
13.	"I Still Remember"	7:03
14.	"Durch den Wald zum Bachhaus"	3:11
15.	"Writing on the Wall"	6:00

German release limited edition bonus tracks
No.	Title	Length
16.	"Fires at Midnight" (acoustic)	9:50
17.	"Home Again" (sung in Greek)	5:17

Additional tracks on Japanese release
No.	Title	Length
18.	"Memmingen"	2:18

== Personnel ==
- Ritchie Blackmore - electric and acoustic guitar, mandolin, mandola, hurdy-gurdy, Renaissance drum
- Candice Night - vocals, shawn, rauschpfeife, tambourine, pennywhistle, cornamuse
- Sir Robert of Normandie (Bob Curiano) - bass, rhythm guitar, harmony vocals
- Carmine Giglio - keyboards, harmony vocals
- Squire Malcolm of Lumley - drums
- Kevin Dunne - drums on 16th Century Greensleeves
- Lady Rraine - harmony vocals
- Chris Devine - violin, recorder, mandolin

== Production notes ==
- Produced by Ritchie Blackmore

== Covers ==
Two of the tracks on this album are covers from Ritchie Blackmore's earlier bands.

- "Soldier of Fortune" is a Deep Purple song, from their Stormbringer album.
- "16th Century Greensleeves" comes from Rainbow's Ritchie Blackmore's Rainbow debut album.

== Charts ==
Chart (2002)	Peak position
German Albums (Offizielle Top 100)	62
