= Beyond the Sunset =

Beyond the Sunset may refer to:

- Beyond the Sunset (film), a 1989 Hong Kong film
- "Beyond the Sunset" (song), a 1950 song by Hank Williams
- Beyond the Sunset: The Romantic Collection, a 2004 Blackmore's Night compilation album
