= The Village Lanterne =

Studio album by Blackmore's Night
- Released: 4 April 2006
- Genre: Folk rock; neo-Medieval
- Length: 60:52
- Label: SPV; Steamhammer (US)
- Producer: Pat Regan

Blackmore's Night chronology
Castles and Dreams (2005)	The Village Lanterne (2006)	Winter Carols (2006)

Professional ratings
Review scores
Source	Rating
AllMusic	3.5/5 stars

The Village Lanterne is the fifth studio album by the group Blackmore's Night, released on Steamhammer US on 4 April 2006. It featured the single "Just Call My Name (I'll Be There)".

The song "Olde Mill Inn" was included as soundtrack in the 2008 movie Yes Man.

== Track listing ==
No.	Title	Writer(s)	Length
1.	"25 Years"	Ritchie Blackmore, Candice Night	4:58
2.	"Village Lanterne"	Blackmore, Night	5:14
3.	"I Guess It Doesn't Matter Anymore"	Blackmore, Night	4:50
4.	"The Messenger" (Instrumental)	Blackmore	2:55
5.	"World of Stone"	trad., Blackmore, Night	4:26
6.	"Faerie Queen / Faerie Dance"	Blackmore, Night	4:57
7.	"St. Teresa"	Eric Bazilian, Rick Chertoff, Rob Hyman, Joan Osborne	5:26
8.	"Village Dance" (Instrumental)	Blackmore	1:58
9.	"Mond Tanz / Child in Time"	Blackmore / Blackmore, Ian Gillan, Roger Glover, Jon Lord, Ian Paice	6:12
10.	"Streets of London"	Ralph McTell	3:48
11.	"Just Call My Name (I'll Be There)"	Blackmore, Night	4:49
12.	"Olde Mill Inn"	Blackmore, Night	3:21
13.	"Windmills"	Blackmore, Night	3:27
14.	"Street of Dreams"	Blackmore, Joe Lynn Turner	4:31

=== Bonus tracks ===
No.	Title	Writer(s)	Length
1.	"Call It Love" (originally the B-side to the Candice Night solo single "Alone with Fate" in 2002)	Night	2:53
2.	"Street of Dreams" (extra track including Joe Lynn Turner as guest vocalist)	Blackmore, Turner	4:30
3.	"All Because of You" (radio edit from Fires at Midnight; released as single in 2004)	Blackmore, Night	3:26
4.	"Once in a Garden" (Japan version only)	Night	3:30

== Personnel ==
- Ritchie Blackmore – electric guitars, acoustic guitars, various drums, hurdy-gurdy
- Candice Night – lead vocals, backing vocals, shawms, rauchpfeife, recorder, chanters
- Pat Regan and the Minstrel Hall Consort – keyboards
- Sir Robert of Normandie (Robert Curiano) – bass
- Sisters of the Moon: Lady Madeline and Lady Nancy (Madeline and Nancy Posner) – harmony vocals
- Bard David of Larchmont (David Baranowski) – keyboards
- Sarah Steiding – violin
- Anton Fig – drums
- Albert Dannemann – bagpipes, backing vocals
- Ian Robertson and Jim Manngard – backing vocals
- Joe Lynn Turner – guest vocals on the bonus version of "Street of Dreams"

== Charts ==
Chart (2006)	Peak position
Finnish Albums (Suomen virallinen lista)	33
German Albums (Offizielle Top 100)	13
Italian Albums (FIMI)	65
Japanese Albums (Oricon)	32
Swedish Albums (Sverigetopplistan)	52
Swiss Albums (Schweizer Hitparade)	67

== Certifications ==
Region	Certification	Certified units/sales
Czech Republic	Gold	5,000
Russia (NFPF)	Gold	25,000
