= Castle of Dreams =

Castle of Dreams may refer to:

- Castle of Dreams (1919 film), a British silent drama film
- Castle of Dreams (2019 film), an Iranian drama film

== See also ==
- Castles and Dreams, a 2005 DVD release by Blackmore's Night
- Dream Castle, a 2011 album by Vektroid
- Dream Castle (film), a 1933 German film
