= I Saw Three Ships =

Traditional Christmas carol

- Genre: Christmas carol
- Language: English
- Published: 1833

I Saw Three Ships
Performed by Matt Norris & the Moon

"I Saw Three Ships (Come Sailing In)" is an English Christmas carol, listed as number 700 in the Roud Folk Song Index. The earliest printed version of "I Saw Three Ships" is from the 17th century, possibly Derbyshire, and was also published by William Sandys in 1833. The song was probably traditionally known as "As I Sat On a Sunny Bank", and was particularly popular in Cornwall.

== Lyrics and melody ==
The modern lyrics are from an 1833 version by the English lawyer and antiquarian William Sandys, and consist of nine verses.

I saw three ships come sailing in
On Christmas day, on Christmas day;
I saw three ships come sailing in
On Christmas day in the morning.

And what was in those ships all three,
On Christmas day, on Christmas day?
And what was in those ships all three,
On Christmas day in the morning?

Our Saviour Christ and His Lady,
On Christmas day, on Christmas day;
Our Saviour Christ and His Lady,
On Christmas day in the morning.

Pray whither sailed those ships all three,
On Christmas day, on Christmas day?
Pray whither sailed those ships all three,
On Christmas day in the morning?

O they sailed into Bethlehem,
On Christmas day, on Christmas day;
O they sailed into Bethlehem,
On Christmas day in the morning.

And all the bells on earth shall ring,
On Christmas day, on Christmas day;
And all the bells on earth shall ring,
On Christmas day in the morning.

And all the Angels in Heaven shall sing,
On Christmas day, on Christmas day;
And all the Angels in Heaven shall sing,
On Christmas day in the morning.

And all the Souls on Earth shall sing,
On Christmas day, on Christmas day;
And all the Souls on Earth shall sing,
On Christmas day in the morning.

Then let us all rejoice amain,
On Christmas day, on Christmas day;
Then let us all rejoice amain,
On Christmas day in the morning.

The lyrics mention the ships sailing into Bethlehem, but the nearest body of water is the Dead Sea about 20 miles (32 km) away. The reference to three ships is thought to originate in the three ships that bore the purported relics of the Biblical Magi to Cologne Cathedral in the 12th century. Another possible reference is to King Wenceslaus II of Bohemia, who bore a coat of arms "Azure three galleys argent". Another suggestion is that the ships are actually the camels used by the Magi, as camels are frequently referred to as "ships of the desert".

== Traditional recordings and collected versions ==
Countless traditional versions of the song have been collected. Many different melodies were used, as is typical of traditional folk songs including Christmas carols. In the 1910s, the English folklorists Cecil Sharp and Janet Blunt noted the tunes and lyrics of dozens of versions, primarily in the south of England.

Several traditional recordings have been made of the song. The American folk song collector James Madison Carpenter recorded several slightly different English versions in the early 1930s, all of which can be heard online via the Vaughan Williams Memorial Library, several recorded in Cornwall and one in Gloucestershire. In 1956, Peter Kennedy recorded a man named John Thomas singing the song in Camborne, Cornwall.

Jean Ritchie, a musician from the Appalachian Mountains, was recorded by Alan Lomax in 1949 singing a traditional version learned from her Kentucky family (whose ancestors seemingly brought the song from England), which can be heard courtesy of the Alan Lomax archive. Ritchie later recorded the song on her album Carols of All Seasons (1959). While Jean Ritchie's family version is the only traditional American version to be recorded, the song was known to be present in the United States in previous decades, particularly in the south.

When they were collecting folk songs in the British Isles in 1952, Jean Ritchie and her husband George Pickow encountered the Irish traditional singer Elizabeth Cronin in Macroom, County Cork, who sang a version called "The Bells of Heaven".

== Arrangements ==
An arrangement by Martin Shaw appears in The Oxford Book of Carols. The Carols for Choirs series of carol books features arrangements of the carol by both Sir David Willcocks and John Rutter. Organist Simon Preston and former conductor of the Choir of King's College, Cambridge, Sir Philip Ledger, have also written arrangements that the choir have performed at the Festival of Nine Lessons and Carols in recent years. There is also a more recent choral arrangement by British composer Richard Fox. This carol is also featured in the musical Caroline, or Change, but as a counterpoint. It has been adapted by Jon Schmidt on his Jon Schmidt Christmas album. John Renbourn has arranged it (in a rather free adaptation) for guitar. The song appears on Nat King Cole's 1960 album The Magic of Christmas.

== Other versions ==
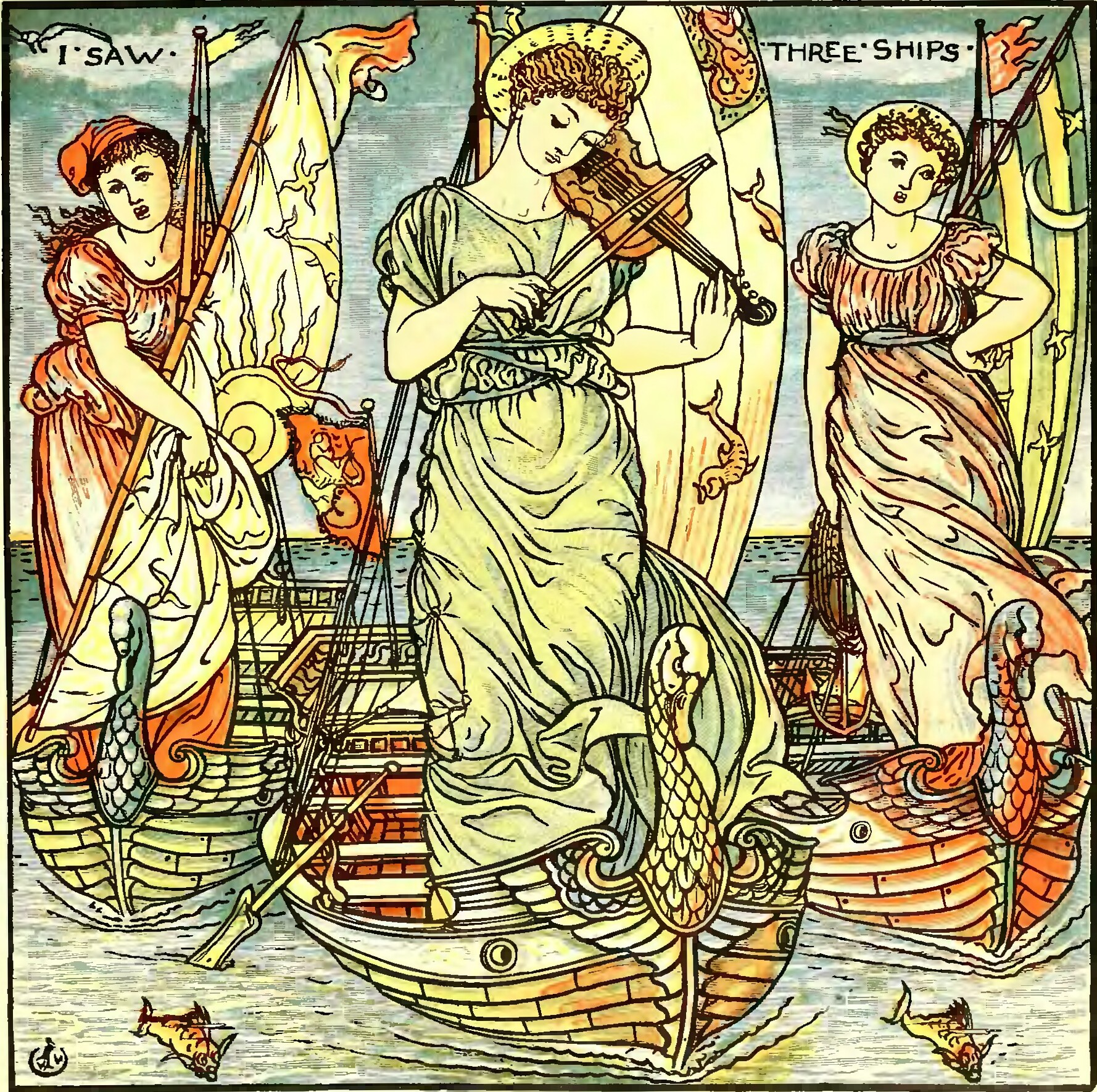
Illustration from Walter Crane's The Baby's Opera (1877)

- "I saw three ships come sailing by on New Year's Day" is a 19th-century version, which mentions three pretty girls in the ship entertaining at a wedding held on New Year's Day.

== Other recordings ==
- English musician Sting recorded a version for the compilation album A Very Special Christmas 3 in 1997.
- Progressive rock singer Jon Anderson released a version as the title track of his album 3 Ships in 1985.
- Keyboardist Keith Emerson recorded an instrumental rock adaptation on his The Christmas Album (1988).
- In 1995, Glen Campbell recorded the song on his Christmas album Christmas with Glen Campbell.
- Cyndi Lauper recorded the song on her 1998 Christmas album Merry Christmas ... Have a Nice Life.
- Barenaked Ladies recorded the song on their 2004 Christmas album Barenaked for the Holidays.
- Sufjan Stevens recorded the song on his 2006 Christmas album Songs for Christmas.
- Blackmore's Night recorded the song on their 2006 Christmas-themed album Winter Carols.
- Lindsey Stirling released her version on her holiday album Warmer in the Winter.
- Celtic Woman released their version on Christmas Cards From Ireland in 2022.

== See also ==
- List of Christmas carols
