= Sea Glass =

Sea Glass may refer to:

- Sea glass, naturally weathered pieces of glass
- Sea Glass (novel), a 2002 romance novel by Anita Shreve
- Sea Glass (King Creosote album), 2004
- Sea Glass (Candice Night album), 2025
- SeaGlass Carousel, a New York City attraction
