= Reflections (Candice Night album) =

Studio album by Candice Night
- Released: September 30, 2011 (Germany); October 22, 2012 (United States)
- Genre: Pop rock
- Length: 38:47
- Label: Soulfood (Germany); UDR music (United States)
- Producer: Pat Regan

Professional ratings
Review scores
| Source | Rating |
|---|---|
| Muzikreviews | 5/5 stars |
| Get Ready To Rock | 4.5/5 stars |

Reflections is the first solo album by singer Candice Night of Blackmore's Night, released in 2011. In comparison with their previous releases, the album contains more modern sounds, and consists of mostly soft rock ballads. It featured the single "Call It Love" (USA), or the radio single "Gone Gone Gone" (Europe). She made a video-clip of the song Black Roses.

== Track listing ==
All songs written by Candice Night

1. "Wind Is Calling (Hush the Wind)" – 4:39
2. "Gone Gone Gone" – 3:28
3. "Black Roses" – 3:31
4. "Now and Then (2011)" – 5:11 (re-recorded new version)
5. "Dangerous Smile" – 4:09
6. "For You" – 3:32
7. "Call It Love" – 4:41 (re-recorded new version)
8. "Robin Red Breast" – 4:13
9. "Alone with Fate" – 3:33 (re-recorded new version)
10. "In Time" – 1:50 (Instrumental)

== Credits ==
- Executive Producer – Candice Night
- Producer – Pat Regan
- Violin – Elizabeth Cary
- Layout & Cover Design: Hiko
- Photography – Keith Major, Michael Keel
- Management: Carole Stevens
- Publishing company: Haunted Song
