= Pastime with Good Company =

Song written by Henry VIII

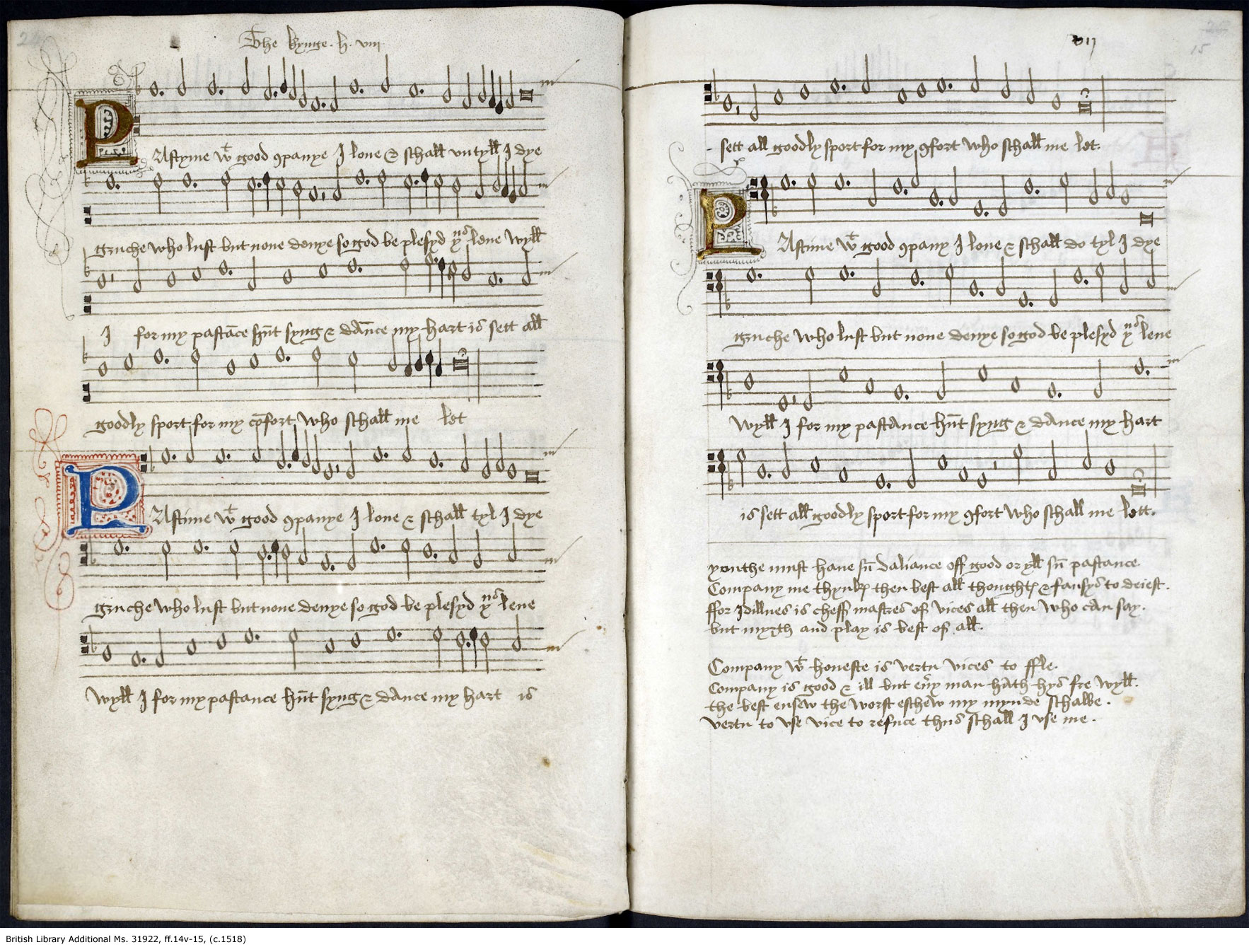
Original score of Pastime with Good Company (c. 1513), held in the British Library, London

"Pastime with Good Company", also known as "The King's Ballad" ("The Kynges Balade"), is an English folk song written by King Henry VIII in the early 16th century. It is regarded as the most famous of the King's creative works, and it became a popular song in England and other European countries during the Renaissance.

== History ==
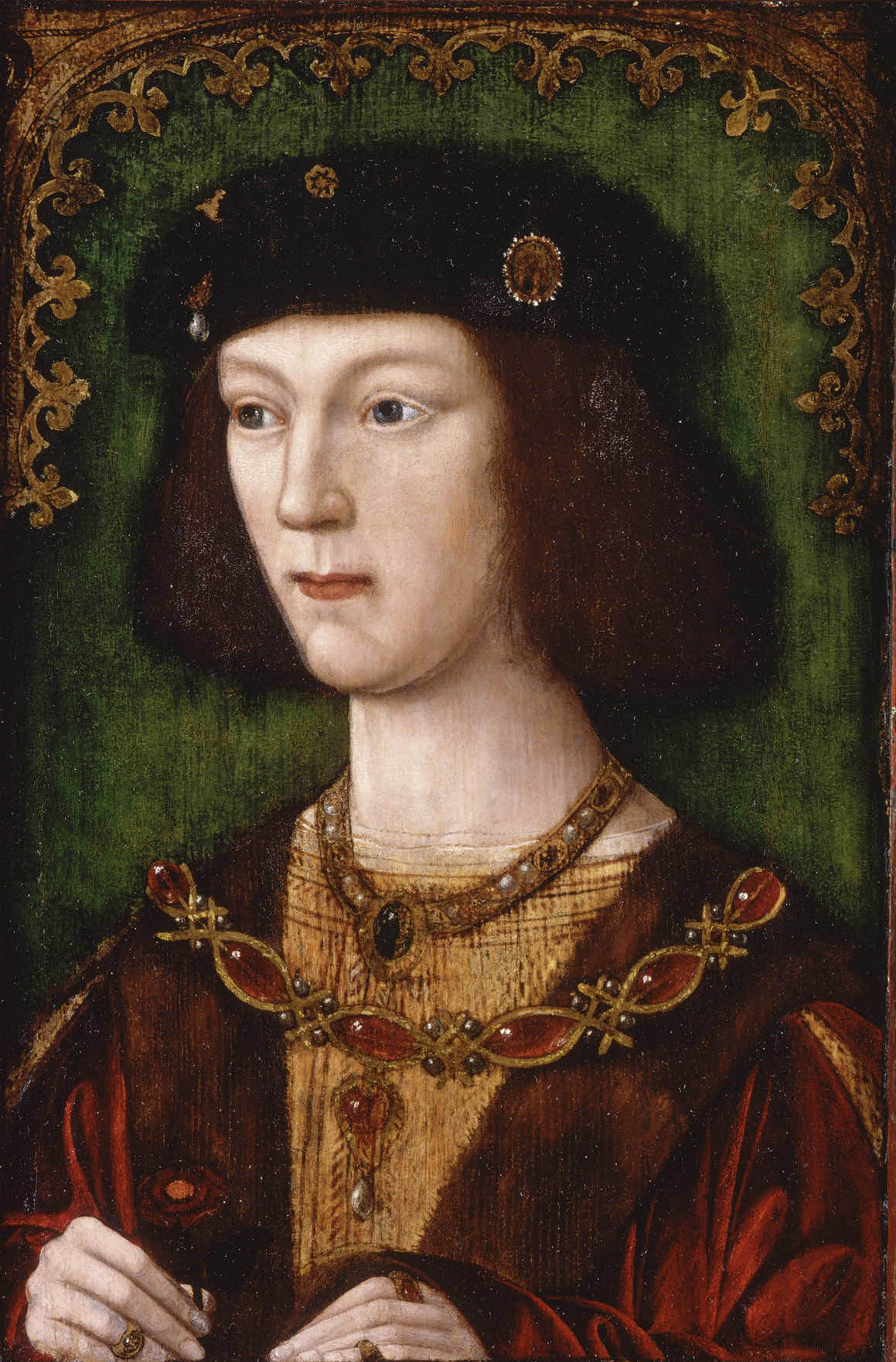
Eighteen-year-old King Henry VIII after his coronation in 1509, around the date he composed Pastime with Good Company

As with every man of noble birth in the Renaissance era, Henry VIII was expected to master many skills, including fencing, hunting, dancing, writing poetry, singing, and playing and composing music, and was educated accordingly as a prince. Henry was considered a talented composer and poet by his contemporaries.

It is thought that the song may have been written for Catherine of Aragon. It is supposed to have been played in court, along with all the other of the King's compositions; however, due to its simple and catchy melody, it also became a popular English tune and was soon interpreted frequently at fairs, taverns and events. It is also believed to have been one of the favourite musical pieces of Queen Elizabeth I. The song is referred to in a number of contemporary documents and publications, attesting to its popularity, and was subject of a wide number of variants and instrumental rearrangements by different musicians in the following years. In the 1548 work The Complaynt of Scotland, the anonymous author mentions "Passetyme with gude companye," as being among the popular songs within the kingdom of Scotland in the early part of the 16th century.

The oldest known version is part of the Henry VIII Manuscript (c. 1513), a collection of 14 works of his authorship currently preserved at the British Library (BM Addl. MSS. 31,922; Addl. MSS. 5,665; MSS. Reg. Appendix 58), which are signed: "By the King's Hand". The manuscript also includes two masses, a motet, an anthem, and other songs and ballads, both vocal and instrumental.

"Pastime with Good Company" remains a favourite piece in choral repertoires, and has been recorded in many variants that include lute, recorder, trombone, percussion and flute, among other instruments. Because of its distinctive early Renaissance melody, it has also been included in different movies and documentaries based on the figure of Henry VIII and the Tudor era.

== Lyrical context ==
The early years of Henry VIII's reign marked a distinctive era of exuberance and extravagance in the English court, made possible by the political stability of the kingdom and wealth of the state's finances. Royal banquets and feasts were held on a continual basis, as were outdoor sports and pastimes, such as hunting, hawking, and jousting and archery tournaments. The young King himself was a skilled sportsman, excelling in horse riding, archery, wrestling, and real tennis. The song was penned during this period, and presents a general praise to all these entertainments and diversions, depicting the general state of mind of leisure and unconcern that prevailed in the royal court at the time. At the same time, the text provides a moral justification for all this merriment: company is preferable to idleness; for the latter breeds vice.

== Contemporary renditions ==
Pastime with Good Company has been subject to a number of renditions in recent times:

- Renamed as "Past Time with Good Company", it was included as the third track on Under a Violet Moon, the second album by Renaissance-inspired folk rock group Blackmore's Night.
- It was played by rock band Jethro Tull, appearing on the remastered CD Stormwatch and The Best of Acoustic Jethro Tull bearing the name "King Henry's Madrigal".
- The song was arranged and played by English progressive/folk rock band Gryphon, appearing on their 1973 self-titled album.
- Under the title Mainstream, an electronic version was arranged by Peter Howell of the BBC Radiophonic Workshop for the 1983 album The Soundhouse.
- The first verse of the song was used as the opening to the song "Legacy of Tudors" by symphonic metal band Serenity on their 2013 album War of Ages.
- Spanish folk band An Danzza created their own rendering of this traditional English piece in their album "Whispers of the Forest".
- The "Swingle Singers", also known as The Swingles, performed the song on their 1989 Album "1812".

== Melody score ==
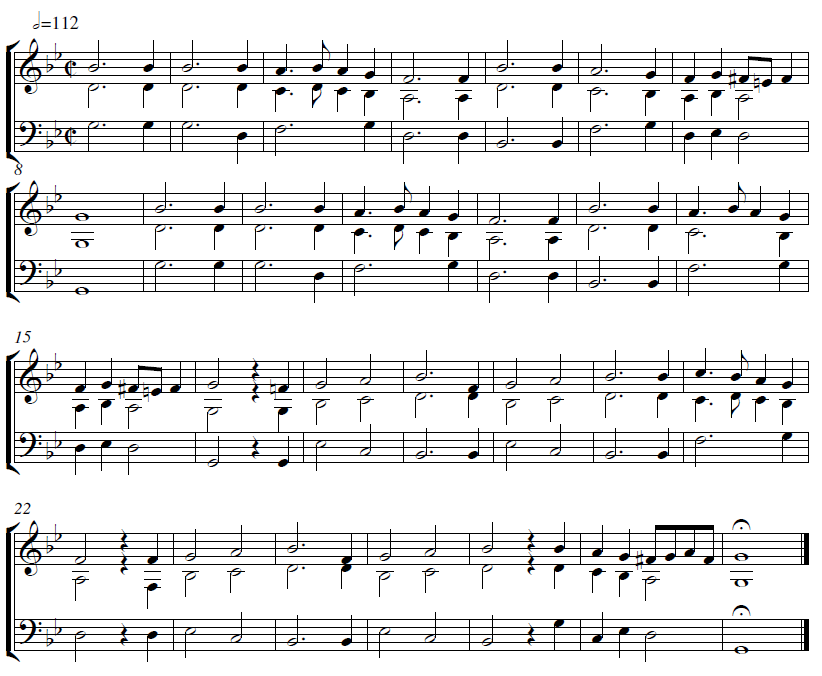
Pastime with Good Company in modern notation

This score is based on British Library MS 31922, with additional bars, slurs, and time signature:

== Lyrics ==
Original spelling as in MS 31922 (Early Modern English)	Modern English (based on MS 31922)
Paſtyme wt good Ꝯpanye	Pastime with good company
I loue & ſchall vntyll I dye	I love and shall until I die
gruche who luſt but none denye	grudge who lust but none deny
ſo god be pleſyd þus leve wyll I	so God be pleased thus live will I
for my paſtāce	for my pastance
hūt ſyng & daūce	hunt sing and dance
my hart is ſett	my heart is set
all goodly ſport	all goodly sport
for my cōfort	for my comfort
who ſchall me let	who shall me let
youthe muſt haue ſū daliance	Youth must have some dalliance
off good or yll ſū paſtance.	of good or ill some pastance
Company me thynkes then beſt	Company methinks then best
all thoughts & fanſys to deieſt.	all thoughts and fancies to digest.
ffor Idillnes	for idleness
is cheff maſtres	is chief mistress
of vices all	of vices all
then who can ſay.	then who can say.
but myrth and play	but mirth and play
is beſt of all.	is best of all.
Company wt honeſte	Company with honesty
is vertu vices to ffle.	is virtue vices to flee.
Company is good & ill	Company is good and ill
but eûy man hath hys fre wyll.	but every man has his free will.
the beſt enſew	the best ensue
the worſt eſchew	the worst eschew
my mynde ſchalbe.	my mind shall be.
vertu to vſe	virtue to use
vice to refuce	vice to refuse
thus ſchall I vſe me.	thus shall I use me.

The '9'-like symbol in the first line in the original is a scribal abbreviation for the com of "company"; another is 'cō', as used in the ninth line.
