= DArtagnan (band) =

German folk rock band

dArtagnan
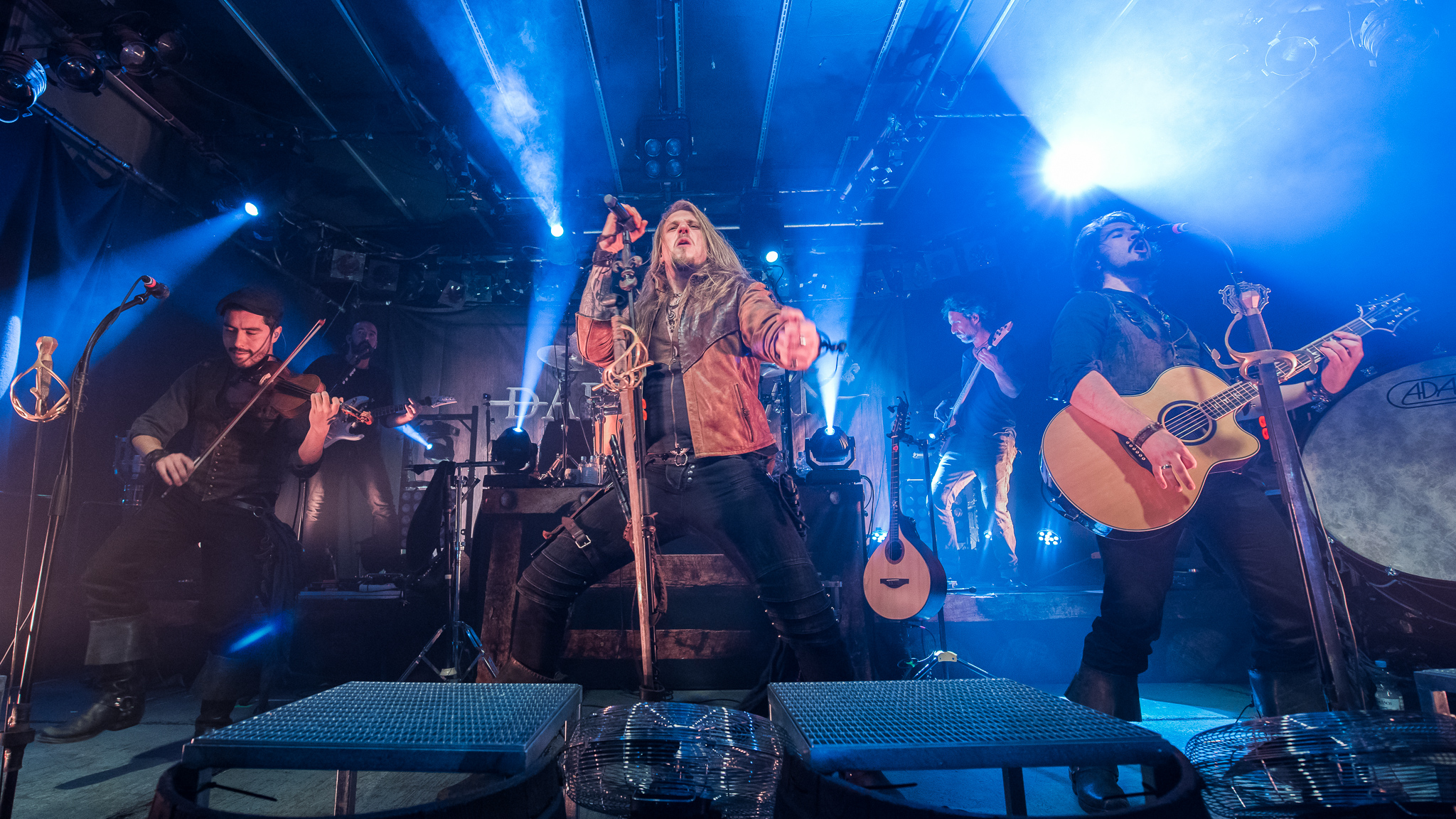
- dArtagnan in concert in 2018.

Background information
- Origin: Nuremberg, Bavaria, Germany
- Genres: Folk rock; Medieval folk rock
- Years active: 2015–present
- Label: Sony Music Entertainment
- Members: Benjamin Metzner; Tim Bernard; Gustavo Strauss; Sebastian Baumann; Matthias Böhm; Haiko Heinz
- Past members: Felix Fischer; Hans Platz
- Website: www.dartagnan.de

dArtagnan is a German folk rock band from Nuremberg. The band's name makes reference to 17th century French soldier Charles de Batz de Castelmore d'Artagnan, made famous by the author Alexandre Dumas in his d'Artagnan Romances, notably in the novel The Three Musketeers.

== History ==
The band was founded in Nuremberg in 2015 by singer Benjamin Metzner, who also plays the mandolin, bagpipes and flute, guitarist and background singer Felix Fischer, and by guitarist and singer Tim Bernard. Metzner and Fischer, who have been friends since they were young, played together in the medieval rock band Feuerschwanz.

This was followed by a recording contract with Sony Music Entertainment and the production of an album by producer Thomas Heimann-Trosien, who had already produced albums for Schandmaul, Nightwish and In Extremo.

The trio's debut album, Seit an Seit, was released on 26 February 2016, and it went to number 7 in the German album charts. The band also made the charts in Austria and Switzerland. In the same year, the debut album was released a second time as a "Gold Edition" with additional tracks and an additional live CD.

On 16 April 2016, the trio played at the Feste der Volksmusik folk festival in Halle, which was broadcast on TV by ARD and ORF. In May, the band toured Germany headlining thirteen concerts. On 15 September 2017, the album Verehrt und verdammt was released, which ranked 11th on the German album charts.

The three founding members are supported live by Haiko Heinz (as the successor to Feuerschwanz member Hans Platz) on guitar, Sebastian Baumann on bass and Matthias Böhm on drums. In December 2017, Felix Fischer announced his departure from the bands Feuerschwanz and dArtagnan. He was replaced by Gustavo Strauss, who added a violin to the band.

On the single "We're Gonna Be Drinking" from Felsenfest (2022) the band made a collaboration with Candice Night from Blackmore's Night, that Blackmore's Night previously had made a version of on their 2003 album Ghost of a Rose called "All for One".

On 1 March 2024, the band released a music video for the song "Ruf der Freiheit"

== Musical style ==
The band describe their style of music as "musketeer rock" (Musketier-Rock), a blend of modern rock sounds interwoven with folk rhythms "some of which echoed through the land hundreds of years ago", together with lyrics that celebrate "love of life, compassion, friendship, camaraderie and courage". Christian Kollasch, writing on laut.de in 2016, compared them with the band Santiano.

== Discography ==
- Seit an Seit (2016)
- Verehrt und verdammt (2017)
- In jener Nacht (2019)
- Feuer & Flamme (2021)
- Felsenfest (2022)
- Herzblut (2024)
- Helden X Hymnen (2026)
