= Bob Curiano =

Musician

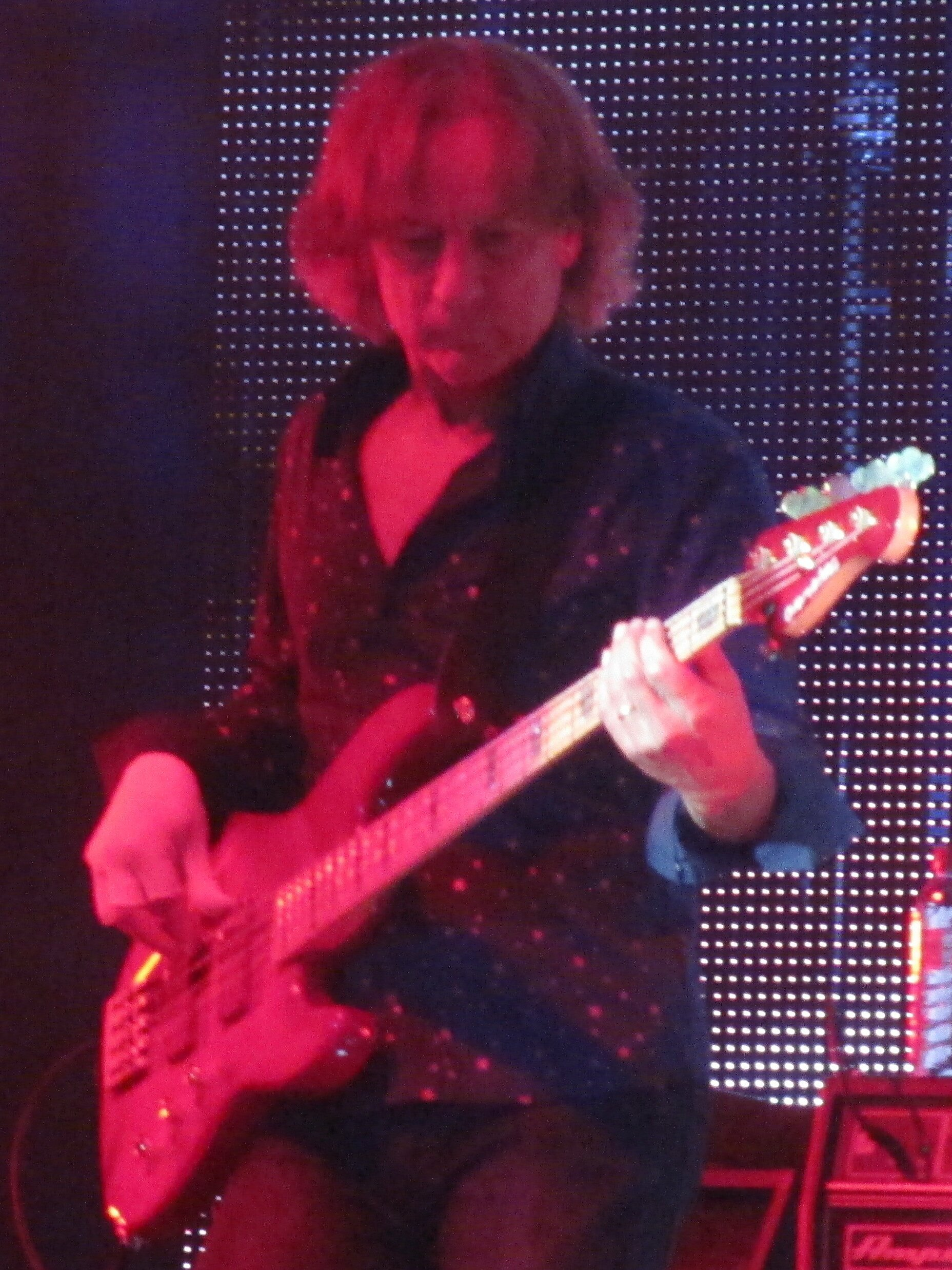
Curiano with Rainbow at Stone Free 2017 Festival

Bob Curiano is an American musician, songwriter and producer, who performs primarily on guitar, bass and vocals. Since 2015 he performs with Rainbow using the name Bob Nouveau. During 2000 to 2006 he performed and recorded with Blackmore's Night with the stage name Sir Robert of Normandie.

== Biography ==
He began touring during the late 1970s as the bass player with the Manhattan-based band Mink De Ville. Curiano was with Mink De Ville for a decade before moving on to pursue his own musical interests of writing and producing.

In 1993, he was the first producer and writer for the Backstreet Boys. “A friend of mine (Lou Pearlman) called and said, ‘I found these kids. Can you come down to Florida?’ They were these nice little kids, but they couldn’t really sing harmonies very well,” recalls Curiano of that initial meeting with the teen band calling themselves “the Backstreet Boys”. In the beginning, the Backstreet Boys were actually performing Curiano’s work: “When Jive Records entered the picture, they cleaned house, brought in their own people, and I sort of got lost in the shuffle”, recalls Curiano.

Curiano first met Ritchie Blackmore at the Normandy Inn, a Long Island tavern. They talked music over a few pints and subsequently played music there, earning Curiano the stage name "Sir Robert of Normandie". In October 2000, Curiano joined Blackmore's Night for the last few shows of the Under a Violet Moon tour. Curiano announced his departure on September 22, 2006 at the end of the second European tour of that year. He returned to his passion of writing music. He and Blackmore parted on good terms and remain friends.

In 2015, when Ritchie Blackmore decided to recommence Rainbow he invited Curiano as the bass player; the new lineup was announced on November 6, 2015. Curiano was listed under the stage name Bob Nouveau. Nouveau means new in French. "That’s a Blackmore prank at its best. He said, “You need a stage name.” I’m thinking to myself, “I have to be a ‘new’ Bob?” So I went with the French. When they announced the band, the reaction was, “Who the hell is Bob Nouveau?” So I started the Facebook page to clarify what happened".

Bob lives in Ridgefield, Connecticut, where he is writing, producing, and freelancing as a guitarist and bass player.

== Discography ==
Blackmore's Night

- Fires at Midnight (2001)
- Ghost of a Rose (2003)
- Castles and Dreams (2004)
- The Village Lanterne (2006)
- Paris Moon (2006)

Rainbow

- Memories in Rock - Live in Germany (2016)
- Live in Birmingham 2016 (2017)
- Waiting for a Sign (2018)
- Memories in Rock II (2018)
