= Marci Geller =

American singer-songwriter

- Born: Marci Anne Geller
- Origin: Suffolk County, New York, United States
- Genres: Folk, adult contemporary, adult alternative
- Occupation: Singer-songwriter
- Instruments: Vocals, piano, acoustic guitar
- Years active: 1989–present
- Label: Sonic Underground
- Website: www.marcigeller.com

Marci Anne Geller is an American singer-songwriter from Long Island, New York, United States. She is an internationally acclaimed touring artist with numerous soundtrack placements on VH1, MTV, A&E, ABC Family, Discovery, FoodTV, etc. She is a member of SESAC and was also named one of the "Top 10 Best Singer/Songwriters" by Independent Songwriter Magazine. She co-owns the independent music production company/label Sonic Underground with Gian DiMauro. The label was birthed from Sonic Underground the recording studio which opened its doors in 1990.

== Early years ==
She was the opening act for and a member of Ritchie Blackmore's group Blackmore's Night (1999–2000) playing keyboard and singing background vocals.

She has collaborated and shared the stage with noted musicians and composers such as David Amram, Christine Lavin, Buskin and Batteau, Vance Gilbert, James Maddock, Adam Forgione, Alex Alexander (Drummer for Dido), Brian Dunne, Kevin Dunne, John Tabacco, Chris Pati, Jim Dexter. Her husband/manager, musician and recording engineer Gian DiMauro, co-produced the CD Here on the Edge along with producer David Warner Cook. Her song "We Carry On" was performed live on the Regis and Kathie Lee show.

Marci was a founding member of the acoustic trio Lucky 13, along with Susan DeVita and Cathy Kreger. Lucky 13 was active from 2008 to early 2011. They released one album.

== Recent projects ==
Geller released the full-length solo CD Open Book in 2012. Open Book has attained accolades of No. 33 on the Folk-DJ Charts and was named one of the Top 100 Albums of 2012 on the Roots Music Report: Folk Chart.

Square Peg, Marci's latest project, was funded by a Kickstarter campaign. The album was released in early 2016. A social media campaign ensued with the hashtag "ImASquarePeg, in which individuals posted pictures of themselves with the album they received. Square Peg charted at No. 8 Folk-DJ charts in May 2016.

== Discography ==
Must Be The Moon (1997) (ep – CD)

1. "Must Be The Moon"
2. "Falling Down"
3. "We Carry On"
4. "Girls' Nite Out"

Here on the Edge (1999) (CD)

1. "I'm So Angry"
2. "Skin"
3. "World Falls Down"
4. "Here On The Edge"
5. "We Carry On"
6. "Not That Girl Anymore"
7. "Light On My Face"
8. "Make It Feel Better"
9. "Look What You've Done"
10. "What's Going on Here"
11. "Falling Down"
12. "Say Goodbye"

Naked (2004) (ep - CD)

1. "Me Versus The Pill"
2. "Suicide"
3. "Home"
4. "The Day I Disappeared"
5. "Ok"

Box of Truth (2008) (CD)

1. "Me Versus the Pill"
2. "Suicide"
3. "Day I Disappeared"
4. "Home"
5. "Close Your Eyes"
6. "OK (The La, La Song)"
7. "That's Good"
8. "My Last Mistake"
9. "Last Night"
10. "Secret She Keeps"
11. "Truth About Lies"

Open Book (2012) (CD)

1. "Day Without the Kids"
2. "Gotta Love That Man"
3. "Awakened Mind (featuring James Maddock)"
4. "Another Breakdown"
5. "Driving In Manhattan"
6. "Thank You (featuring John Tabacco)"
7. "No Weather Down (featuring Vance Gilbert)"
8. "Little Light"
9. "Promets-Moi (featuring Jean-Philippe Martignoni)"
10. "Jack Sang On - Tribute to Jack Hardy"
11. "Tom McCarthy"
12. "Surf the Undertow"

Square Peg (2015) (CD)

1. "Save Me"
2. "I'm Not Yours Yet"
3. "She Was Happy Then"
4. "Strong"
5. "Forgotten Dreams"
6. "Back Around"
7. "I Just Love You"
8. "Only Love Matters"
9. "Nearly"
10. "Sally Knows"
11. "Won't You Stay?"
12. "Would You Still Believe?"

Bare (2019) (CD)

1. "Joy Is"
2. "Last Kid Picked for the Team"
3. "Breathe"
4. "It's the Rain"
5. "After the Flood"
6. "Two People"
7. "I Do"
8. "All This is Free"
9. "Red Wine & Chocolate"
10. "The City That God Forgot"
11. "Replaced by Stars"
12. "Happy Valentine's Day"
13. "Playing the Grownup"
14. "MIssing Piece"
15. "Bare"

== Awards ==
- 2017, Dunst Music Project for Social Justice, Selected Artist/Song
- 2016, Sync Summit, Official Showcase Artist
- 2016, Durango Songwriters Expo, Official Showcase Artist
- 2016, No. 93, Top 100 Folk Albums of 2016 Int'l Folk DJ
- 2015, South Florida Folk Festival, Main Stage Artist
- 2014, NERFA 1-Day, Chatham, New Jersey, Showcase Artist
- 2014, Folk Alliance International Conference, Kansas City, MO, Featured Showcase Artist
- 2014, South Florida Folk Festival, Main Stage Artist
- 2013, Huntington Folk Festival, Main Stage Artist
- 2013, NERFA 1-Day, Chatham, New Jersey, Official Showcase Artist
- 2013, Connecticut Folk Festival Song Competition, Top 5 Finalist
- 2012, No. 68 of Top 100 Folk Albums of 2012 Int'l Folk DJ
- 2012, No. 33 of Top Album on Folk DJ for September 2012
- October 26, 2012, "Open Book" (2012) climbed to #10 on the Cashbox Magazine/Roots Music Report's Folk Top 50
- October 26, 2012, "Open Book" (2012) climbed to #3 on the Cashbox Magazine/Roots Music Report's NY: Roots Radio Airplay Chart
- October 1, 2012 - Tracks 1 & 13 from "Open Book" (2012) chosen as a "Rich’s Pick" Midnight Special by Rich Warren, WFMT, 98.7
