= All Our Yesterdays (Blackmore's Night album) =

Studio album by Blackmore's Night
- Released: 18 September 2015
- Recorded: 2015
- Genre: folk rock, neo-Medieval
- Length: 48:55
- Label: Frontiers Records

Blackmore's Night chronology
Dancer and the Moon (2013)	All Our Yesterdays (2015)	Nature's Light (2021)

All Our Yesterdays is the tenth studio album by the group Blackmore's Night, released on September 18, 2015.

== Track listing ==
No.	Title	Writer(s)	Length
1.	"All Our Yesterdays"	Ritchie Blackmore, Candice Night	4:00
2.	"Allan Yn N Fan" (Instrumental; Geyers cover)	Georg Hesse	3:26
3.	"Darker Shade of Black" (Instrumental)	Blackmore	6:03
4.	"Long Long Time" (Linda Ronstadt cover)	Gary White	4:12
5.	"Moonlight Shadow" (Mike Oldfield cover)	Oldfield	4:12
6.	"I Got You Babe" (Sonny & Cher cover)	Sonny Bono	4:00
7.	"The Other Side"	Blackmore, Night	3:19
8.	"Queen's Lament" (Instrumental)	Blackmore	2:07
9.	"Where Are We Going from Here"	Blackmore, Night	5:40
10.	"Will o' the Wisp"	Blackmore, Night	4:31
11.	"Earth Wind and Sky"	Night	3:41
12.	"Coming Home"	Blackmore, Night	3:34

== Credits ==
- Ritchie Blackmore - acoustic and electric guitars, hurdy-gurdy, nyckelharpa, mandola
- Candice Night - lead and harmony vocals, woodwinds, tambourine
- Earl Grey of Chimay (Mike Clemente) - bass & rhythm guitar
- Scarlet Fiddler - violin
- Bard David of Larchmont (David Baranowski) - keyboards, backing vocals
- Troubador of Aberdeen (David Keith) - percussion
- Lady Lynn (Christina Lynn Skleros) - harmony vocals
- Executive producer / director - Ritchie Blackmore
- Assistant producer / sound engineer / orchestral arrangements - Pat Regan

== Charts ==
Chart (2015)	Peak position
Austrian Albums (Ö3 Austria)	48
Belgian Albums (Ultratop Wallonia)	41
Dutch Albums (Album Top 100)	48
Finnish Albums (Suomen virallinen lista)	39
German Albums (Offizielle Top 100)	19
Japanese Albums (Oricon)	62
Scottish Albums (OCC)	85
Swiss Albums (Schweizer Hitparade)	64
UK Albums (OCC)	94
