= William Sandys (antiquarian) =

British folk-song collector (1792–1874)

William Sandys (1792 – 18 February 1874) (pronounced "Sands") was an English solicitor, member of the Percy Society, fellow of the Society of Antiquaries of London, and remembered for his publication Christmas Carols Ancient and Modern (London, Richard Beckley, 1833), a collection of seasonal carols that Sandys had gathered and also apparently improvised.

== Collection ==
Sandys' book marked the first appearances of many now-classic English carols, including "God Rest You Merry, Gentlemen", and "The First Noel", and contributed to the mid-Victorian revival of the holiday. Sandys presented his collections in three parts. The first part "Containing Ancient Carols and Christmas Songs, From the Early Part of the Fifteenth to The End of the Seventeenth Century" contains examples in Middle English and Early Modern English.

The second part of Sandys' collection contains "A Selection From Carols Still Used In The West Of England" which Sandys claimed to have selected "from upwards of one hundred obtained in different parts of the West of Cornwall, many of which, including those now published, are still in use. Some few of them are printed occasionally in the country, and also in London, Birmingham, and other places, as broadside carols; others have appeared, with some variation, in Mr. Gilbert's collection, having been derived from similar sources; but a large portion, including some of the most curious, have, I believe, never been printed before."

Among the carols that made their first appearance here are the classics "The First Noel", "God Rest Ye Merry, Gentlemen", "I Saw Three Ships". Some have the traditional forms of carols. Others are recognisably composed. In the current atmosphere of "Merry England" that included the revival of Christmas that was signalled by Charles Dickens' "A Christmas Carol" (1843), they all quickly developed their present reputations for being sixteenth century or earlier.

A third part offered "Specimens of French Provincial Carols."

Sandys repeated his success with Christmas-tide, Its History, Festivities and Carols, With Their Music (London: John Russell Smith, 1852), where he reprinted many of his finds.
