= Dancer and the Moon =

Studio album by Blackmore's Night
- Released: June 11, 2013
- Genre: folk rock, neo-Medieval
- Length: 53:10
- Label: Frontiers Records (Europe), Universal Music (Canada), Frontiers Records (Universal) (U.S.)
- Producer: Pat Regan

Blackmore's Night chronology
A Knight in York (2012)	Dancer and the Moon (2013)	All Our Yesterdays (2015)

Singles from Dancer and the Moon
- 1. "The Moon Is Shining (Somewhere over the Sea)" Released: May 6, 2013; 2. "Dancer and the Moon" Released: June 24, 2013

Professional ratings
Review scores
Source	Rating
PopMatters	(5/10)

Dancer and the Moon is the ninth studio album by the group Blackmore's Night, released on June 11, 2013. It entered at # 189 on USA's Billboard Album Charts. It was also nominated for NAR award in Best Vocal Album of the Year.

"Carry On… Jon" is an instrumental tribute to Deep Purple co-founder Jon Lord, who died on 16 July 2012 at age 71.

== Track listing ==
No.	Title	Writer(s)	Length
1.	"I Think It's Going to Rain Today" (Randy Newman cover)	Newman	3:54
2.	"Troika"	Ritchie Blackmore, Candice Night	3:30
3.	"The Last Leaf"	Blackmore, Night	4:05
4.	"Lady in Black" (Uriah Heep cover)	Ken Hensley	5:48
5.	"Minstrels in the Hall" (Instrumental)	Blackmore	2:38
6.	"The Temple of the King" (Rainbow cover)	Blackmore, Ronnie James Dio	4:26
7.	"Dancer and the Moon"	Blackmore, Night	4:55
8.	"Galliard" (Instrumental)	Blackmore	2:00
9.	"The Ashgrove"	Traditional	2:21
10.	"Somewhere over the Sea (The Moon Is Shining)"	Blackmore, Night	4:07
11.	"The Moon Is Shining (Somewhere over the Sea)"	Blackmore, Night	6:19
12.	"The Spinner's Tale"	Traditional; by Richard Lionheart, Blackmore, Night	3:30
13.	"Carry On… Jon" (Instrumental)	Blackmore	5:37

== Personnel ==
- Ritchie Blackmore – acoustic and electric guitars, nyckelharpa, mandola, hurdy gurdy, tambourine
- Candice Night – lead vocals, harmony vocals, all renaissance and medieval woodwinds
- Bard David of Larchmont (David Baranowski) – keyboards, backing vocals
- Lady Kelly DeWinter (Kelly Morris) – harmony vocals, French horn
- Earl Grey of Chimay (Mike Clemente) – bass and rhythm guitar
- The Scarlet Fiddler (Claire Smith Bermingham) – violin
- Troubador of Aberdeen (David Keith) – percussion
- Pat Regan - producer, sound engineer, orchestral arrangements

== Charts ==
Chart (2013)	Peak position
Austrian Albums (Ö3 Austria)	39
Belgian Albums (Ultratop Flanders)	151
Belgian Albums (Ultratop Wallonia)	85
Finnish Albums (Suomen virallinen lista)	31
German Albums (Offizielle Top 100)	13
Hungarian Albums (MAHASZ)	21
Japanese Albums (Oricon)	41
Norwegian Albums (VG-lista)	24
Scottish Albums (OCC)	90
Swedish Albums (Sverigetopplistan)	22
Swiss Albums (Schweizer Hitparade)	40
UK Albums (OCC)	83
UK Independent Albums (OCC)	16
US Billboard 200	189
US Independent Albums (Billboard)	40
US New Age Albums (Billboard)	3
