= Autumn Sky =

Studio album by Blackmore's Night
- Released: 3 September 2010
- Recorded: 2010
- Genre: Folk rock, neo-Medieval
- Length: 61:33
- Label: Spinefarm

Blackmore's Night chronology
Secret Voyage (2008)	Autumn Sky (2010)	A Knight In York (2012)

Professional ratings
Review scores
Source	Rating
Metal Glory	7/10 stars

Autumn Sky is the eighth studio album by British-American folk-rock band Blackmore's Night. It is dedicated to their daughter Autumn Esmerelda Blackmore, who was born on 27 May 2010. It was released on 3 September 2010 in Europe and on 18 January 2011 in the U.S.

Autumn Sky entered at number one on the New Age Billboard Charts. It reached number 13 in Greece, number 29 in Finland, number 36 in Sweden, number 43 in Austria and number 57 in Switzerland. In Russia it went gold. The album won a Zone Music Award for the Best Vocal Album.

== Track listing ==
No.	Title	Writer(s)	Length
1.	"Highland" (One More Time cover)	Peter Grönvall, Nanne Nordqvist	5:46
2.	"Vagabond (Make a Princess of Me)"	Ritchie Blackmore, Candice Night	5:23
3.	"Journeyman (Vandraren)" (Nordman cover; English lyrics: Night)	Helena Bäckman, Py Bäckman, Håkan Hemlin, Mats Wester	5:41
4.	"Believe in Me"	Blackmore, Night	4:26
5.	"Sake of the Song"	Blackmore, Night	2:52
6.	"Song and Dance" (Instrumental)	Blackmore	1:59
7.	"Celluloid Heroes" (The Kinks cover)	Ray Davies	5:27
8.	"Keeper of the Flame"	Blackmore, Night	4:41
9.	"Night at Eggersberg" (Instrumental)	Blackmore	2:16
10.	"Strawberry Girl"	Blackmore, Night	4:05
11.	"All the Fun of the Fayre"	Blackmore, Night	3:56
12.	"Darkness"	trad., Blackmore, Night	3:26
13.	"Dance of the Darkness" (Instrumental)	trad., Blackmore	3:33
14.	"Health to the Company"	trad., Blackmore	4:16
15.	"Barbara Allen"	trad., Blackmore	3:46
16.	"Gottlische Devise" (Japanese Bonus Track)	trad., Blackmore	3:36

== Personnel ==
- Ritchie Blackmore - guitars, renaissance drum, nyckelharpa, hurdy-gurdy, mandola, mandolin
- Candice Night - vocals, harmonies, penny whistle, gemshorn, rauschpfeife, shawms, bombards, chanters, recorders
- Bard David of Larchmont - keyboards, backing vocals
- Gypsy Rose (Elizabath Cary) - violin, harmony vocals
- Earl Grey of Chimay (Mike Clemente) - bass and rhythm guitar
- Squire Malcolm of Lumley (Malcolm Dick) - percussion and drums
- Albert Danneman - renaissance woodwinds and vocals

== Additional personnel (from sleeve) ==
- Producer: Pat Regan
- Orchestra: Pat Regan's Orchestral Consort
- Mastering: Brad Vance (Red Mastering)

== Charts ==
Chart (2010)	Peak position
Austrian Albums (Ö3 Austria)	43
Finnish Albums (Suomen virallinen lista)	29
German Albums (Offizielle Top 100)	15
Japanese Albums (Oricon)	50
Swedish Albums (Sverigetopplistan)	36
Swiss Albums (Schweizer Hitparade)	57
UK Rock & Metal Albums (OCC)	39
