= Sea Glass (Candice Night album) =

Studio album by Candice Night
- Released: 25 April 2025
- Genres: Pop rock, folk rock
- Length: 48:51
- Label: earMUSIC
- Producer: Candice Night

Candice Night chronology
Starlight, Starbright (2015)	Sea Glass (2025)

Sea Glass is the third solo studio album by American singer-songwriter Candice Night, best known as the lead vocalist of Blackmore's Night. It was released on 25 April 2025 through the German label earMUSIC, and marks her first solo release in ten years, following Starlight, Starbright (2015).

== Background and themes ==
The album features a blend of rock, country, and acoustic pop influences. According to Night, the songwriting process for Sea Glass was deeply personal, addressing themes of loss, love, new beginnings, and the relationship between parents and children.

The production involved several of Night's family members. The track "Promise Me" features a guest appearance by her children, while her husband, guitarist Ritchie Blackmore, performs on "The Last Goodbye". The lead single, "Angel and Jezebel," was released in both a rock-oriented version and an acoustic "back porch" version to showcase the album's stylistic range.

The collection of songs is inspired by her experiences and people she has known in the last ten years, including the challenging COVID pandemic. "So I was looking for joy in those dark periods, and some of the things wound up being inspirations for some songs on the album. So it's interesting how you wind up getting inspirations for creativity even in dark times," she said in an interview with Eon Music.

== Critical reception ==
Upon its release, Sea Glass received coverage from several music publications. Marcel Hartenberg of Written in Music noted the album's roots-influenced sound. Phil Aston of Now Spinning Magazine conducted an interview with Night that focused on the emotional depth of the new material.

The album was Rolling Stone (France) album of the week April/May 2025, Goldmine Magazine's song of the year, and entered into the Official Independent Album Breakers chart at #18. Unsung Hero, the latest single from Sea Glass, reached 1M viewers on Youtube According to Goldmine the Music Collector's Magazine, "Unsung Hero is a powerful tribute to women with an Americana bounce."

Candice Night performed Angel and Jezebel, Promise Me and Unsung Hero at her induction into Long Island Music and Entertainment Hall Of Fame (May 2025)

== Track listing ==
All tracks are written by Candice Night, except where noted.

All tracks are written by Candice Night.

No.	Title	Length
1.	"Sea Glass"	6:57
2.	"Unsung Hero (She’ll Never Tell)"	4:08
3.	"The Line Between"	5:26
4.	"Angel and Jezebel (Rock Version)"	4:17
5.	"Promise Me"	4:01
6.	"Dark Carnival"	3:32
7.	"The Last Goodbye"	4:43
8.	"When I Want to Fly" (Night, Sergey Sedykh)	3:24
9.	"Another Day"	3:59
10.	"Nature Boy" (Eden Ahbez)	3:20
11.	"Angel and Jezebel (Back Porch Version)"	4:59
Total length:		48:51

== Personnel ==
- Candice Night – vocals, production
- Ritchie Blackmore – guitar on "The Last Goodbye"
- Sergey Sedykh – songwriting on "When I Want to Fly"
- Claire Smith Bermingham - violin (tracks 4, 6)
- Autumn and Rory Night-Blackmore – guest vocals on "Promise Me"
- Pat Regan - guitars, keyboards, engineering
- Brendan Keenan - engineering
- Eike Freese - mastering
