= Castles and Dreams =

Video by Blackmore's Night
- Released: 30 May 2005
- Length: 230 minutes
- Label: SPV
- Director: Roger Bisson

Blackmore's Night chronology
Beyond the Sunset: The Romantic Collection (2004)	Castles and Dreams (2005)	The Village Lanterne (2006)

Castles and Dreams is a DVD released by the band Blackmore's Night in 2005. It was released as a Region 2 DVD on May 30, 2005, after being pushed back multiple times. It was released as a Region 1 DVD on October 11, 2005. "Castles and Dreams" is a song by Blackmore’s Night from their 1999 album Under a Violet Moon.

In 2008, the DVD went Gold in Germany.

== Track listing ==
=== Disc 1 ===
==== Concert Burg Veldenstein- Burg Neuhaus 2004 ====
1. Intro 00:55
2. Cartouche 06:01
3. Queen for a Day I 03:23
4. Queen for a Day II 02:22
5. Under a Violet Moon 5:31
6. Minstrel Hall 03:13
7. Past Times With Good Company 06:00
8. Soldier of Fortune 03:52
9. Durch den Wald zum Bach Haus 04:36
10. Once in a Million Years 04:27
11. Mr. Peagram's Morris And Sword 02:15
12. Home Again 08:17
13. Ghost of a Rose 07:45
14. Child in Time / Mond Tanz 06:25
15. Wind in the Willows 05:51
16. Village on the Sand 07:21
17. Renaissance Faire 05:11
18. The Clock Ticks On 09:10
19. Loreley 03:59
20. All for One 08:32
21. Black Night 06:12
22. Dandelion Wine 4:51

==== Bonus Material ====
1. Behind the Scenes
2. Ritchie Blackmore Guitar Special

=== Disc 2 ===
==== Acoustics ====
1. I Think it's Going to Rain Today (music and lyrics by Randy Newman)- Burg Rheinfels
2. Christmas Eve- Burg Waldeck 2004
3. Shadow of the Moon
4. Queen for a Day
5. Under a Violet Moon

==== Videos ====
1. The Times They Are A Changin'
2. Way to Mandalay
3. Once in a Million Years
4. Hanging Tree
5. Christmas Eve

==== Documentaries ====
1. Blackmore's Night: The Story
2. Once Upon a Time: The Ritchie and Candice Story
3. Tour Start: St. Goar 2004
4. Hanging Tree: Making Music with Our Friends
5. Schlossgeister- German TV Special
6. Goldene Henne- German TV Appearance
7. Fernsehgarten- German TV Appearance

==== Proclamations ====
1. Discography- Blackmore's Night
2. Biography- Candice Night
3. Biography- Ritchie Blackmore
4. Interview- Band and Members

==== Special Bonus ====
1. Slide Show
2. Candice Night Private Movies
