= Nature's Light =

Studio album by Blackmore's Night
- Released: March 12, 2021
- Genre: Folk rock
- Length: 46:19
- Label: earMUSIC
- Producer: Ritchie Blackmore

Blackmore's Night chronology
All Our Yesterdays (2015)	Nature's Light (2021)

Nature's Light is the eleventh studio album by the group Blackmore's Night, released on March 12, 2021.

== Track listing ==
All tracks are written by Ritchie Blackmore and Candice Night, except where noted.

No.	Title	Writer(s)	Length
1.	"Once Upon December"	trad.	3:09
2.	"Four Winds"		3:02
3.	"Feather in the Wind"		4:30
4.	"Darker Shade of Black" (Instrumental)	Blackmore	6:05
5.	"The Twisted Oak"		4:18
6.	"Nature's Light"		4:30
7.	"Der Letzte Musketier" (Instrumental; eng. The Last Musketeer)	Blackmore	4:58
8.	"Wish You Were Here (2021)" (Rednex cover)	Teijo Agélii-Leskelä	5:04
9.	"Going to the Faire"	trad.	4:34
10.	"Second Element" (Sarah Brightman cover)	Thomas Schwarz, Frank Peterson, Mathias Meissner, Andrea Weiss	6:05
Total length:			46:19

Japan edition bonus CD (Disc 2)
No.	Title	Writer(s)	Length
1.	"Shadow of the Moon"	Blackmore, Night	5:06
2.	"Under a Violet Moon"	Blackmore, Night	4:23
3.	"The Storm"	Blackmore, Night	6:11
4.	"Way to Mandalay"	Blackmore, Night	6:25
5.	"Streets of London"	Ralph McTell	3:45
6.	"Empty Words"	trad., Blackmore, Night	2:40
7.	"Believe in Me"	Blackmore, Night	4:20
8.	"Dancer and the Moon"	Blackmore, Night	4:55
9.	"All Our Yesterdays"	Blackmore, Night	3:59
Total length:			42:29

== Credits ==
- Ritchie Blackmore - acoustic and electric guitars, hurdy-gurdy, nyckelharpa, mandola
- Candice Night - lead and harmony vocals, woodwinds, tambourine
- Autumn and Rory Blackmore - backing vocals
- Bard David of Larchmont (David Baranowski) - keyboards, backing vocals
- Executive Producer - Ritchie Blackmore
- Assistant Producer / Sound Engineer / Orchestral Arrangements - Pat Regan

== Charts ==
Chart performance for Nature's Light
Chart (2021)	Peak position
Austrian Albums (Ö3 Austria)	14
Belgian Albums (Ultratop Flanders)	63
Belgian Albums (Ultratop Wallonia)	101
German Albums (Offizielle Top 100)	7
Scottish Albums (Official Charts)	25
Swedish Vinyl Albums (Sverigetopplistan)	10
Swiss Albums (Schweizer Hitparade)	22
UK Album Downloads (Official Charts)	46
UK Folk Albums (Official Charts)	3
UK Independent Albums (Official Charts)	8
