= An Danzza =

Spanish musical group

- Origin: Madrid, Spain
- Genres: pagan folk, Viking metal, folk metal, neoclassical, folk
- Years active: 2004–present
- Labels: An Danzza (independent)
- Members: Haydée Mariñoso; Andrés Campuzano
- Website: www.facebook.com/andanzza/ (facebook)

An Danzza is an independent Spanish folk project from Madrid, Spain, produced by Andrés Campuzano with lead singer Haydée Mariñoso. Its music is mostly neofolk but also spans metal and neoclassical.

He has been active since 2004, and released their first album Last Autumn Tears in 2010. By December 2018 they had released six more albums , one EP and five singles (as a side project).

The project is strongly inspired by the many pagan traditions of Europe. Their works feature mythology both old and new, from Celtic mythology, Norse mythology and Classical mythology to Tolkien's legendarium.

The songs are varied, using many different instruments, most commonly the tambourine, didgeridoo, traditional drums, guitar, flute, harp. Lyrics are usually sung in English, except for the 2011 album Canción de Los Juncos, which is entirely sung in Spanish by Macarena Martín. A wide range of vocalists have featured in An Danzza's albums and singles throughout the years, with Haydée Mariñoso being the lead vocalist.

The project was first brought to the stage in 2016 with a band, offering several concerts and recording a video clip for Beltane song. In December 2018 Andrés continued his work in the studio and The Claws of Dawn was issued, an album with 15 songs full of fantasy and folk sounds: the music travels between two worlds: life and death, reality and fantasy, light and darkness.

== Albums ==
- Last Autumn Tears (2010)
- Canción de Los Juncos (2011)
- Tierra de Andanzas (2013)
- Scintilla(2014)
- Whispers of the Forest (2016)
- The Spooky Circle (2017)
- The Claws of Dawn (2018)

== Metal Singles ==
- "Gods Of My Fathers" (2014)
- "Open Your Eyes" (2014)
- "Fallen Heroes" (2015)
- "Gorgon Queen" (2015)
- "See You In Valhalla" (2015)
