= Candice Night =

American singer (born 1971)

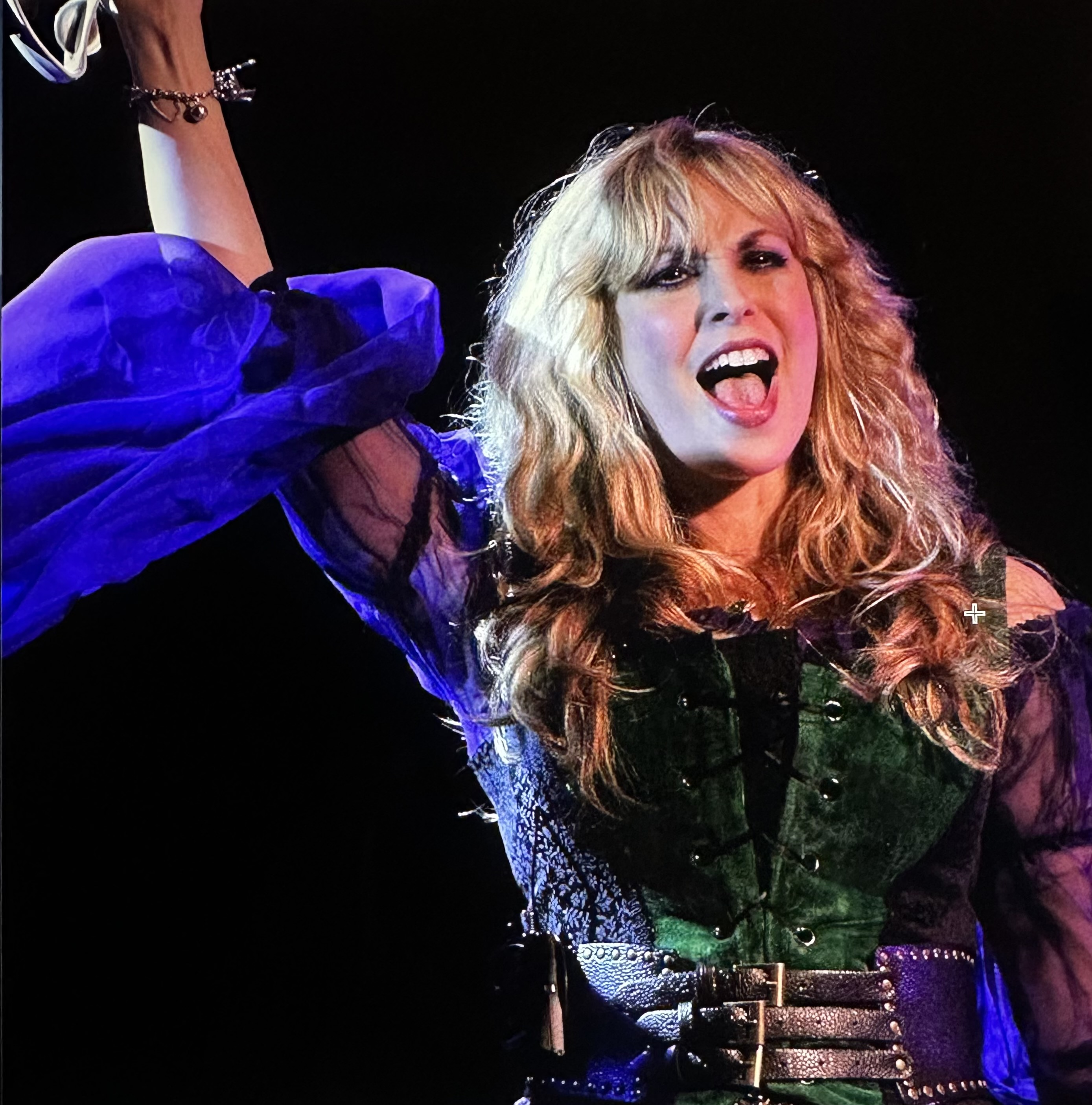

Background information
- Born: Candice Lauren Isralow; May 8, 1971 (age 55); Hauppauge, New York, U.S.
- Genres: Medieval folk rock; folk rock; hard rock; new-age
- Occupations: Singer; musician; songwriter
- Instruments: Vocals; shawm; tin whistle; tambourine
- Years active: 1990s–present
- Labels: Edel; SPV; Ariola; Frontiers
- Member of: Blackmore's Night; Rainbow
- Website: candicenight.com

Candice Night (born May 8, 1971) is an American singer and musician. She has been the vocalist/lyricist and multi-instrumentalist for the traditional folk rock project Blackmore's Night since its origins in 1997 with her husband, guitarist Ritchie Blackmore. She is also the backing vocalist for Rainbow from 1994 to 1997 and 2015–2019, again with Blackmore. Her first solo album, Reflections, was released in 2011.

== Career ==
Born in Hauppauge, Long Island, New York, as Candice Lauren Isralow, she took piano lessons for a couple of years. She began modeling as "Candice Loren" at 12 years of age. She appeared in everything from commercials to print ads, and promoted products at trade shows until her 20s. Night also had her own radio show on a rock music radio station on Long Island, and attended New York Institute of Technology where she studied communications. She is Jewish.

She was once a Rainbow fan, and met Ritchie Blackmore to ask him for an autograph in 1989. They talked about ghosts, music, travel, history, and philosophy, gradually became friends, and then lived together from 1991. She provided backing vocals on the instrumental track "Difficult to Cure" in 1993's European tour of Deep Purple. She also provided singing backing vocals on "Ariel", "Black Masquerade", "Wolf to the Moon" and "Hall of the Mountain King" for Stranger in Us All, the CD by Rainbow, as well as writing lyrics for the four songs on the aforementioned album. Despite her being inexperienced as a professional lead singer, Blackmore encouraged her to become his musical partner. She then wrote lyrics for most of the songs on the first Blackmore's Night album, Shadow of the Moon, where she supplied lead vocals. Those songs were written with her voice in his mind.

Night has also composed some full songs, including "Now and Then" on Under a Violet Moon (1999) and "3 Black Crows" and "Ivory Tower" on Ghost of a Rose (2003). She continues to write all the lyrics for the Blackmore's Night songs and plays nine renaissance and medieval instruments.

Since then, she has been awarded gold albums and other accolades for Blackmore's Night's music, and has charted internationally with the group. Their 2008 release, Secret Voyage, entered at No. 1 on the new-age Billboard Charts and stayed there for four weeks, and then held on in the top 10 for an additional 14 weeks. She continues to be involved in music, performing both on CDs and in concert, writing lyrics, singing, and playing medieval instruments: shawm, cornamuse, rauschpfeife, pennywhistle, and chanters.

In 2006, Night sang on Helloween's "Light the Universe" song from their Keeper of the Seven Keys: The Legacy album, and she also appeared In Helloween's music video for that track.

She played the part of Oria in the rock opera Story of Aina, with Sass Jordan and Glenn Hughes. She sang three songs on Beto Vázquez Infinity's eponymous album with Tarja Turunen from Nightwish and Sabine Edelsbacher from Edenbridge. The Blackmore's Night song "Old Mill Inn" was heard in Jim Carrey's 2008 film Yes Man.

She also appears on interactive video screens throughout the US and Japan in the theme park MagiQuest as both Princess Amora and Princess Candice. These parks now have a cooperation throughout the US. She was also the Faerie Queen for Faerie Magazine for two years, appearing on the cover in spring 2007, and making appearances and performing at the Faerie Festivals throughout the US.

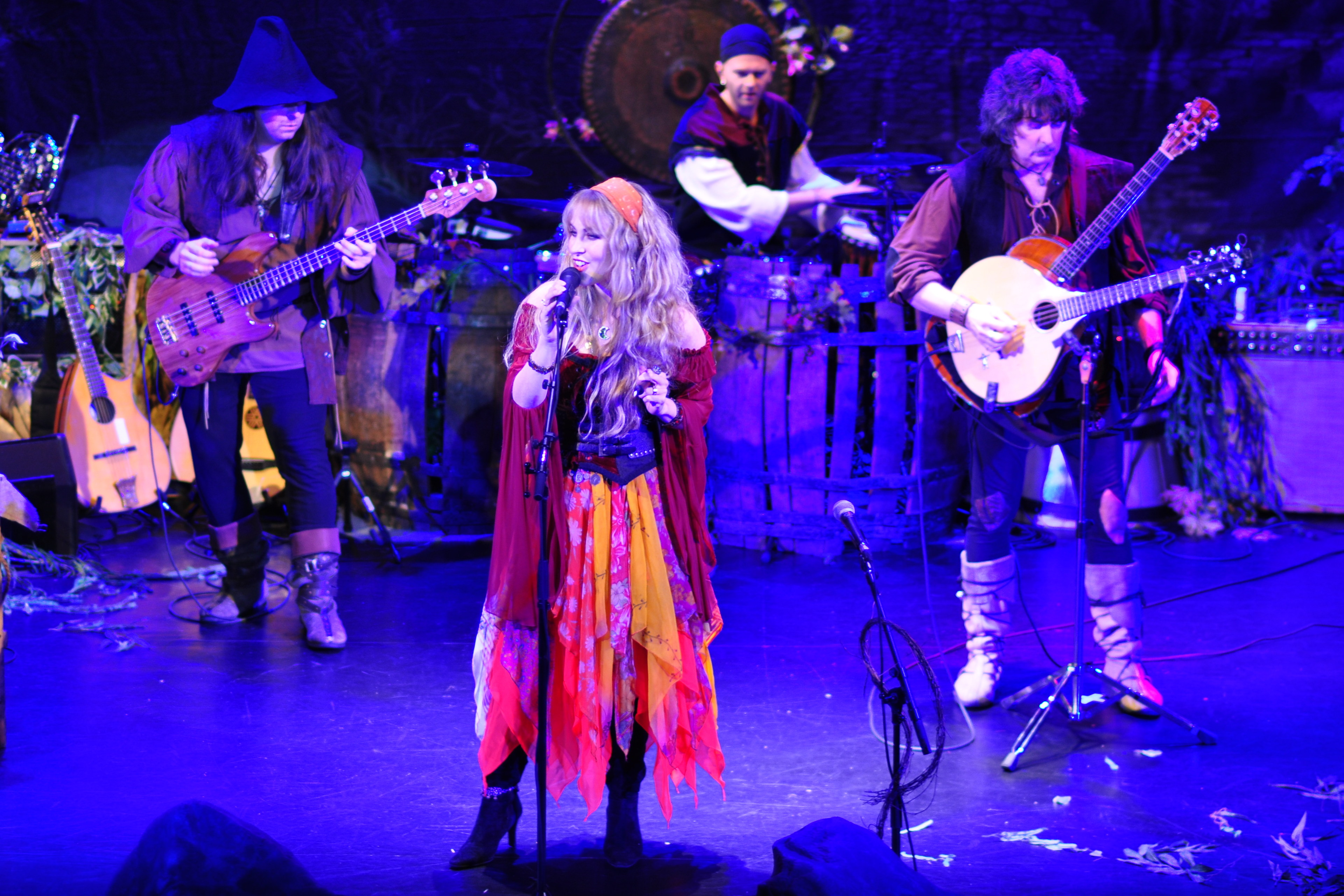
In New York, 2012

After being engaged for nearly fifteen years, Night and Blackmore married in October 2008.

Their daughter was born in 2010, and was the inspiration for Blackmore's Night's album, Autumn Sky, which was released in September 2010. In 2012, Night gave birth to their second child.

She made her first solo album Reflections, which was released in October 2011. All songs were written by Night and consist of mostly soft rock ballads. Her 2nd solo release was "Starlight, Starbright". Inspired by the birth of her children, this collection of songs are covers of classic favorites as well as new composition meant to bring the listener to the land of dreams.

In September 2018, Avantasia's mastermind Tobias Sammet announced that Night joined the cast for the eighth studio album of the supergroup. She provided co-lead vocals (together with Sammet himself) for the track "Moonglow", from the album of the same name (2019). Candice and dArtagnan released the duet We're Gonna Be Drinking in 2022.

"It's Too Late" featuring Candice Night and Dweezil Zappa was released on July 1, 2022, as part of The Prog Collective's album Songs We Were Taught. It is a cover of the Carole King song, released via Cleopatra Records.

Her latest solo release, Sea Glass, charted upon its April 2025 debut and was named Goldmine Magazine’s Song of the Year.

== Discography ==
=== With Rainbow ===
- Stranger in Us All (1995)
- Black Masquerade (2013)
- Memories in Rock: Live in Germany (2016)
- Live in Birmingham 2016 (2017)
- Memories in Rock II (2018)

=== With Blackmore's Night ===
- Shadow of the Moon (1997)
- Under a Violet Moon (1999)
- Fires at Midnight (2001)
- Ghost of a Rose (2003)
- The Village Lanterne (2006)
- Winter Carols (2006)
- Secret Voyage (2008)
- Autumn Sky (2010)
- Dancer and the Moon (2013)
- All Our Yesterdays (2015)
- Nature's Light (2021)

=== Solo ===
- Alone with Fate (2002) – Limited single
- Reflections (2011)
- Starlight Starbright (2015)
- Sea Glass (2025)

=== Guest appearances ===
- Beto Vázquez Infinity – Beto Vázquez Infinity (2001), "Through Times Part II", "Golden Hair", "Through Times Part III" & "Promises Under the Rain"
- Aina – Days of Rising Doom (2003), "The Siege of Aina" & "Rape of Oria"
- Helloween – Keeper of the Seven Keys: The Legacy (2005), "Light the Universe"
- Various Artists – A Life in Yes: The Chris Squire Tribute (2018), "Don't Kill the Whale"
- Avantasia – Moonglow (2019), "Moonglow"
- William Shatner – The Blues (2020), "The Thrill Is Gone"
- The Prog Collective – Songs We Were Taught (2022), "It's Too Late" with Dweezil Zappa
- "We're Gonna Be Drinking" (2022) - dArtagnan (band)
- Inducted into the Long Island Music Hall of Fame in May 2025, performing songs from the Sea Glass CD: Unsung Hero, Promise Me, and Angel and Jezebel.
