= Ghost of a Rose =

Studio album by Blackmore's Night
- Released: June 30, 2003 (Europe); August 30, 2003 (North America)
- Recorded: January/April 2003
- Genre: folk rock; neo-Medieval
- Length: 60:19
- Label: SPV; Steamhammer (US)
- Producer: Pat Regan, Ritchie Blackmore

Blackmore's Night chronology
Past Times with Good Company (2002)	Ghost of a Rose (2003)	Beyond the Sunset: The Romantic Collection (2004)

Professional ratings
Review scores
Source	Rating
AllMusic	2/5 stars

Ghost of a Rose is the fourth studio album by the folk rock group Blackmore's Night, released June 30, 2003. It features covers of Joan Baez's "Diamonds and Rust", and Jethro Tull's "Rainbow Blues".

== Background ==
Allusive to the alchemical feat of palingenesis by Paracelsus, the phrase "ghost of a rose" was first stated in the penultimate paragraph of the physician-philosopher Thomas Browne's 1658 discourse The Garden of Cyrus which concludes, "...and though in the Bed of Cleopatra, can hardly with any delight raise up the ghost of a Rose".

== Track listing ==
No.	Title	Writer(s)	Length
1.	"Way to Mandalay"	Blackmore, Night	6:27
2.	"3 Black Crows"	Night	3:43
3.	"Diamonds and Rust" (Joan Baez)	Baez	4:54
4.	"Cartouche"	Blackmore, Night	3:48
5.	"Queen for a Day (Part 1)"	Blackmore, Night	3:05
6.	"Queen for a Day (Part 2)"	Blackmore	1:36
7.	"Ivory Tower"	Night	4:24
8.	"Nur eine Minute" (Instrumental; Nur eine Minute being German for "Just One Minute")	Blackmore	1:08
9.	"Ghost of a Rose"	Blackmore, Night, Edward Elgar	5:45
10.	"Mr. Peagram's Morris and Sword" (Instrumental)	Blackmore	2:01
11.	"Loreley"	Blackmore, Night	3:36
12.	"Where Are We Going from Here"	Blackmore, Night	4:05
13.	"Rainbow Blues" (Jethro Tull)	Ian Anderson	4:30
14.	"All for One" (based on Breton drinking song 'Son Ar Chistr')	trad.	5:36
15.	"Dandelion Wine"	Blackmore, Night	5:39

=== Bonus tracks ===
Special edition
No.	Title	Writer(s)	Length
16.	"Mid Winter's Night" (live acoustic version)	trad., Blackmore, Night	4:45
17.	"Way to Mandalay" (radio edit)	Blackmore, Night	3:02

Japanese edition
No.	Title	Writer(s)	Length
16.	"Just One Minute"	Blackmore	1:10

== Personnel ==
- Ritchie Blackmore – acoustic guitar, electric guitar, hurdy-gurdy, mandola, tambourine, Renaissance drum
- Candice Night – chant, penny whistle, shawm, vocals, background vocals

Additional musicians

- Madeline Posner (Lady Madeline) – harmony vocals ("Ghost of a Rose", "Way to Mandalay")
- Nancy Posner (Lady Nancy) – harmony vocals ("Ghost of a Rose", "Way to Mandalay")
- Marnen Laibow-Koser (Lord Marnen of Wolfhurst) – violin, viola
- Robert Curiano (Sir Robert Of Normandie) – bass
- David Baranowski (Bard David Of Larchmont) – background vocals ("All for One")
- Mike Sorrentino – drums, percussion
- Tim Cotov – background vocals ("All for One")

== Production ==
- Sascha Braun – photography
- Michael Keel – photography
- David Owen – photography
- Johanna Pieterman – cover art
- Pat Regan – mixing, producer
- Takaomi Shibayama – design
- Carole Stevens – photography

== Charts ==
Chart (2003)	Peak position
German Albums (Offizielle Top 100)	11
Japanese Albums (Oricon)	77
Swedish Albums (Sverigetopplistan)	39
Swiss Albums (Schweizer Hitparade)	75

== Certifications ==
Region	Certification	Certified units/sales
Czech Republic	Gold	5,000

== Covers ==
- "Way to Mandalay" was recorded by Axel Rudi Pell on his 2014 album Into the Storm.
