= Fires at Midnight =

Studio album by Blackmore's Night
- Released: 10 July 2001
- Recorded: During February/April 2001
- Genre: Folk rock; neo-Medieval
- Length: 70:29
- Label: SPV/Steamhammer
- Producer: Pat Regan and Ritchie Blackmore

Blackmore's Night chronology
Under a Violet Moon (1999)	Fires at Midnight (2001)	Past Times with Good Company (2002)

Professional ratings
Review scores
Source	Rating
AllMusic	4/5 stars

Fires at Midnight is the third studio album by British-American neo-medieval folk rock band Blackmore's Night, released on July 10, 2001, through SPV/Steamhammer Records. In comparison to their previous two releases, there are more electric guitar parts on this album, whilst maintaining a folk rock direction. The album was a Top Ten record in Germany.

In December 2001, Fires At Midnight was a finalist on the New Age Voice award for the best vocal album of the year. In 2004 the album went Gold in the Czech Republic.

The album was one of the 10 international bestsellers in Russia during the Autumn of 2001. The single "Times They Are A Changin" stayed in the Russian top 20 Hits for over 9 weeks.

It featured the singles "The Times They Are a Changin'", "Home Again" and "All Because of You".

In 2024 a new deluxe edition was released on earMUSIC/Edel as 2CD and LP. The reissue continues the celebration of over 25 years of activity for the band, which started with the remixed reissue of the debut album “Under A Violet Moon”. All songs have been remixed from the original multi-tracks recording by Eike Freese at Chameleon Studios in Hamburg. For the occasion, two bonus tracks were added, both featuring new vocal parts by Candice Night: "Written in the Stars" and the title track "Fires at Midnight"

== Track listing ==
No.	Title	Writer(s)	Length
1.	"Written in the Stars"	Ritchie Blackmore, Candice Night	4:47
2.	"The Times They Are a-Changin'" (Bob Dylan cover)	Bob Dylan	3:30
3.	"I Still Remember"	trad. by Tielman Susato, Blackmore, Night	5:39
4.	"Home Again"	Blackmore, Night	5:25
5.	"Crowning of the King"	trad. by Tielman Susato, Blackmore, Night	4:29
6.	"Fayre Thee Well" (Instrumental)	Blackmore	2:05
7.	"Fires at Midnight"	trad. by Alfonso X, Blackmore, Night	7:33
8.	"Hanging Tree"	Blackmore, Night	3:44
9.	"Storm"	Blackmore, Night	6:08
10.	"Mid Winter's Night"	trad., Blackmore, Night	4:27
11.	"All Because of You"	Blackmore, Night	3:34
12.	"Waiting Just for You"	trad. by Jeremiah Clarke, Blackmore, Night	3:14
13.	"Praetorius (Courante)" (Instrumental)	trad. by Michael Praetorius	1:54
14.	"Benzai-Ten"	Blackmore, Night	3:49
15.	"Village on the Sand"	Blackmore, Night	4:54
16.	"Again Someday"	Blackmore, Night	1:42

=== Bonus tracks ===
No.	Title	Writer(s)	Length
1.	"Possum's Last Dance" (Instrumental; European version only)	Blackmore	2:41
2.	"Sake of Song" (B-side to the European Single "The Times They Are a Changin'"; US and Japan version only)	Blackmore, Night	3:13

== Personnel ==
- Ritchie Blackmore – electric and acoustic guitars, hurdy-gurdy, mandolin, renaissance drums, tambourine
- Candice Night – lead and backing vocals, pennywhistle, shawms, harp, recorder, electronic bagpipes
- Sir Robert of Normandie (Robert Curiano) – bass, backing vocals
- Carmine Giglio – keyboards
- Chris Devine – violin, viola, recorders, flute
- Mike Sorrentino – drums
- Richard Wiederman – trumpets
- John Passanante – trombone
- Pat Regan – keyboards
- Albert Dannemann – bagpipes on "All Because of You"

== Charts ==
Chart (2001)	Peak position
Austrian Albums (Ö3 Austria)	32
German Albums (Offizielle Top 100)	9
Japanese Albums (Oricon)	20
Swiss Albums (Schweizer Hitparade)	81
UK Rock & Metal Albums (OCC)	18

== Certifications ==
Region	Certification
Czech Republic	Gold
