= Shadow of the Moon =

Studio album by Blackmore's Night
- Released: June 2, 1997 (Europe); February 17, 1998 (United States)
- Genre: folk rock; Medieval rock
- Length: 65:21
- Label: Edel (Germany) / Edel America
- Producer: Pat Regan and Ritchie Blackmore

Blackmore's Night chronology
Shadow of the Moon (1997)	Under a Violet Moon (1999)

Professional ratings
Review scores
Source	Rating
AllMusic	3/5 stars

Shadow of the Moon is the debut studio album by the folk rock band Blackmore's Night, released June 2, 1997. The album stayed on the German charts for 17 weeks, and received gold certification in Japan for 100,000 albums shipped to stores.

In 2023, a 25th anniversary edition was released, containing new mixes of each song. This CD contains a home session of Shadow of the Moon and Spirit of the Sea, the bonus DVD contains video clips of Shadow of the Moon, No Second Chance and Renaissance Faire.

== Track listing ==
No.	Title	Writer(s)	Length
1.	"Shadow of the Moon"	Ritchie Blackmore, Candice Night	5:07
2.	"The Clock Ticks On"	trad. by Tielman Susato, Blackmore, Night	5:14
3.	"Be Mine Tonight"	Blackmore, Night	2:51
4.	"Play Minstrel Play"	trad. by Pierre Attaingnant, Blackmore, Night	3:58
5.	"Ocean Gypsy" (Renaissance cover)	Michael Dunford, Betty Thatcher	6:05
6.	"Minstrel Hall" (Instrumental)	Blackmore	2:36
7.	"Magical World"	trad. Wassail, Blackmore, Night	4:01
8.	"Writing on the Wall"	trad. by Pyotr Ilyich Tchaikovsky, Blackmore, Night	4:35
9.	"Renaissance Faire"	trad. by Tielman Susato, Blackmore, Night	4:16
10.	"Memmingen" (Instrumental)	Blackmore	1:06
11.	"No Second Chance"	Blackmore, Night	5:38
12.	"Mond Tanz" (Instrumental; Mondtanz being German for "Moon Dance")	Blackmore	3:33
13.	"Spirit of the Sea"	Blackmore, Night	4:50
14.	"Greensleeves"	trad.	3:47
15.	"Wish You Were Here" (Rednex cover)	Teijo Agélii-Leskelä	5:02

=== Bonus track ===
US / UK editions
No.	Title	Writer(s)	Length
16.	"Possum's Last Dance" (Instrumental)	Blackmore	2:42

1999 Japanese edition
No.	Title	Writer(s)	Length
16.	"Minstrel Hall (strings version)" (Instrumental)	Blackmore	2:34

== Personnel ==
- Ritchie Blackmore – electric guitars, acoustic guitars, bass, mandolin, drum, tambourine
- Candice Night – lead vocals, backing vocals
- Pat Regan – keyboards
- Gerald Flashman – recorders, trumpet, French horns
- Tom Brown – cello
- Lady Green – viola, violins

Guest appearances

- Ian Anderson – flute on "Play Minstrel Play"
- Scott Hazell – backing vocals on "Play Minstrel Play"

== Charts ==
Chart (1997)	Peak position
German Albums (Offizielle Top 100)	37
Japanese Albums (Oricon)	11

2023 chart performance for Shadow of the Moon
Chart (2023)	Peak position
Austrian Albums (Ö3 Austria)	75
German Albums (Offizielle Top 100)	16
Scottish Albums (OCC)	24
Swiss Albums (Schweizer Hitparade)	74
UK Independent Albums (OCC)	11

== Certifications ==
Certifications for Shadow of the Moon
Region	Certification	Certified units/sales
Japan (RIAJ)	Gold	100,000^{^}
^{^} Shipments figures based on certification alone.
