= Under a Violet Moon =

Studio album by Blackmore's Night
- Released: May 25, 1999 (Germany) / July 13, 1999 (United States)
- Recorded: During 1998/1999
- Genres: folk rock; neo-Medieval
- Length: 58:49
- Labels: Edel (Germany); Platinum Entertainment (United States)
- Producers: Ritchie Blackmore, Jeff Glixman, Roy McDonald

Blackmore's Night chronology
Shadow of the Moon (1997)	Under a Violet Moon (1999)	Fires at Midnight (2001)

Professional ratings
Review scores
Source	Rating
AllMusic	3/5 stars

Under a Violet Moon is the second studio album by the group Blackmore's Night, released May 25, 1999. Under a Violet Moon won the New Age Voice award for the best vocal album of the year.

== Track listing ==
No.	Title	Writer(s)	Length
1.	"Under a Violet Moon"	Ritchie Blackmore, Candice Night	4:23
2.	"Castles and Dreams"	Blackmore, Night	3:33
3.	"Past Time with Good Company"	trad. by King Henry VIII	3:24
4.	"Morning Star"	Blackmore, Night	4:41
5.	"Avalon"	trad.	3:03
6.	"Possum Goes to Prague" (Instrumental)	Blackmore	1:13
7.	"Wind in the Willows" (feat. John Ford)	Alan Bell	4:12
8.	"Gone with the Wind" (Includes "Polyushko-polye" by Lev Knipper, a popular Russian song of mid-1930s.)	Blackmore, Knipper, Night	5:24
9.	"Beyond the Sunset" (Instrumental)	Blackmore	3:45
10.	"March the Heroes Home"	trad. by Michael Praetorius, Blackmore, Night	4:39
11.	"Spanish Nights (I Remember It Well)"	trad.	5:23
12.	"Catherine Howard's Fate"	Blackmore, Night	2:34
13.	"Fool's Gold"	Blackmore, Night	3:32
14.	"Durch den Wald zum Bach Haus" (Instrumental)	Blackmore	2:31
15.	"Now and Then" (including the Prelude in C by J.S. Bach)	Night	3:11
16.	"Self Portrait" (Rainbow cover)	Blackmore, Ronnie James Dio	3:19

== Personnel ==
Blackmore's Night

- Ritchie Blackmore – guitars, mandolin, bass, Renaissance drums, tambourine
- Candice Night – vocals, pennywhistle

Guest musicians

- John Ford – vocals, bass on #07, background vocals on #01 & 10
- Miri Ben-Ari – violin on #04 & 11
- Peter Rooth – bass on #01 & 16; drum programming on #07 & 08
- Mick Cervino – additional bass on #04
- Kevin Dunne – drums
- Mike Goldberg – military drum on #03
- Adam Forgione – additional keyboards on #04
- Jens Johansson – keyboards on #01, 04, 07 & 15
- Jeff Glixman, Roy McDonald – additional keyboards
- Jason Chapman – trumpet and flugelhorn on #08
- Thomas Roth – bagpipes, backing vocals on #10
- Albert Danneman – bagpipes, backing vocals on #10
- Albrecht Schmidt-Reinthaler – harpsichord on #10
- Jost Pogrzeba – percussion on #10
- Christof Heus – trumpet on #10
- Adolf Lehnberger – trombone on #10
- Gell Spitz – trumpet on #10
- Rolf Spitz – trombone on #10
- Mark Pender – trumpet
- Mr. & Mrs. Heller – hurdy-gurdy
- Scott Hazell, Sue Goehringer, John Gould, Trish – backing vocals

== Charts ==
Chart (1999)	Peak position
German Albums (Offizielle Top 100)	20
Japanese Albums (Oricon)	13
UK Rock & Metal Albums (Official Charts)	16

== Packaging ==
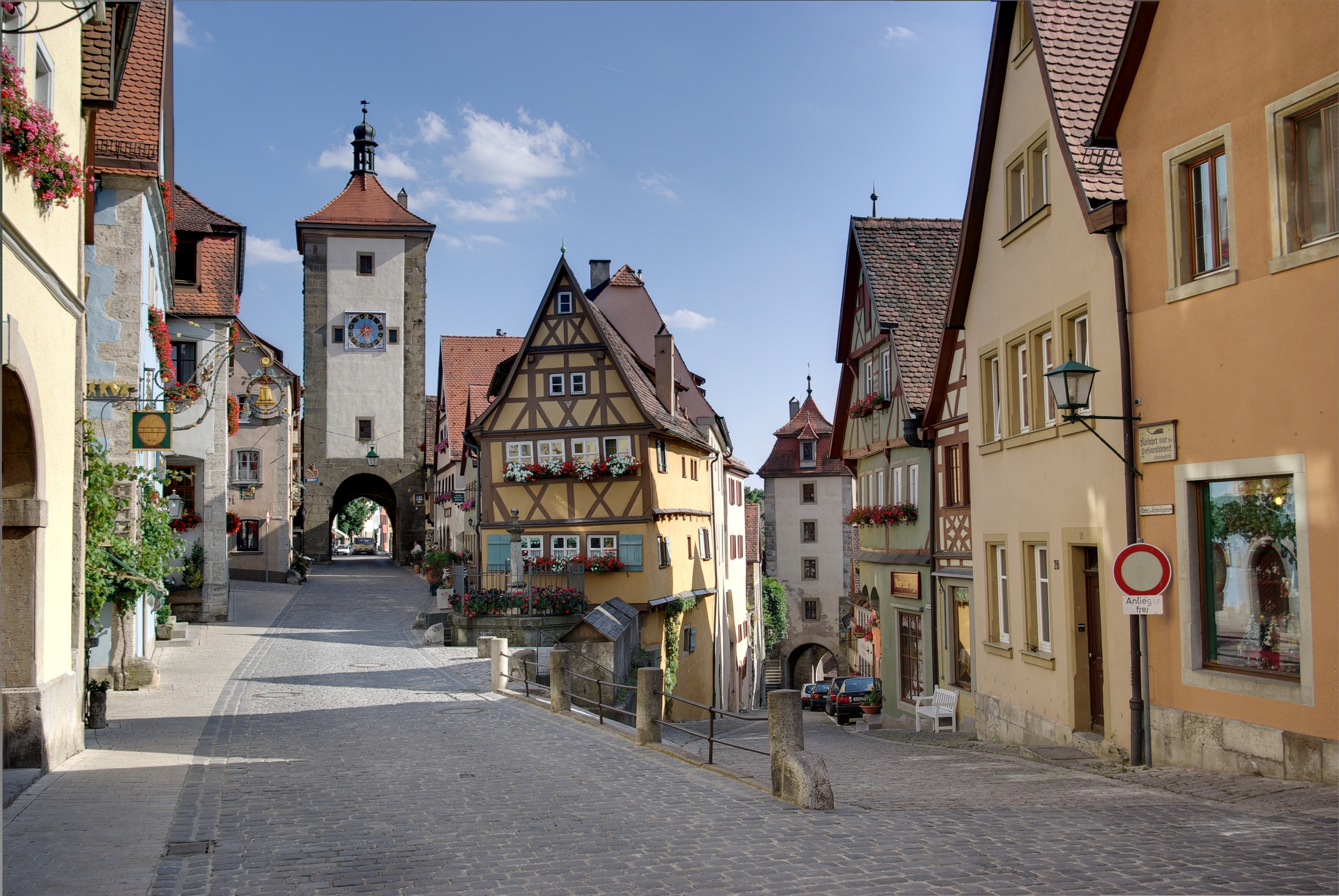
The albums' cover image is inspired by the German old town street in Rothenburg ob der Tauber
