= Blackmore's Night =

British-American band

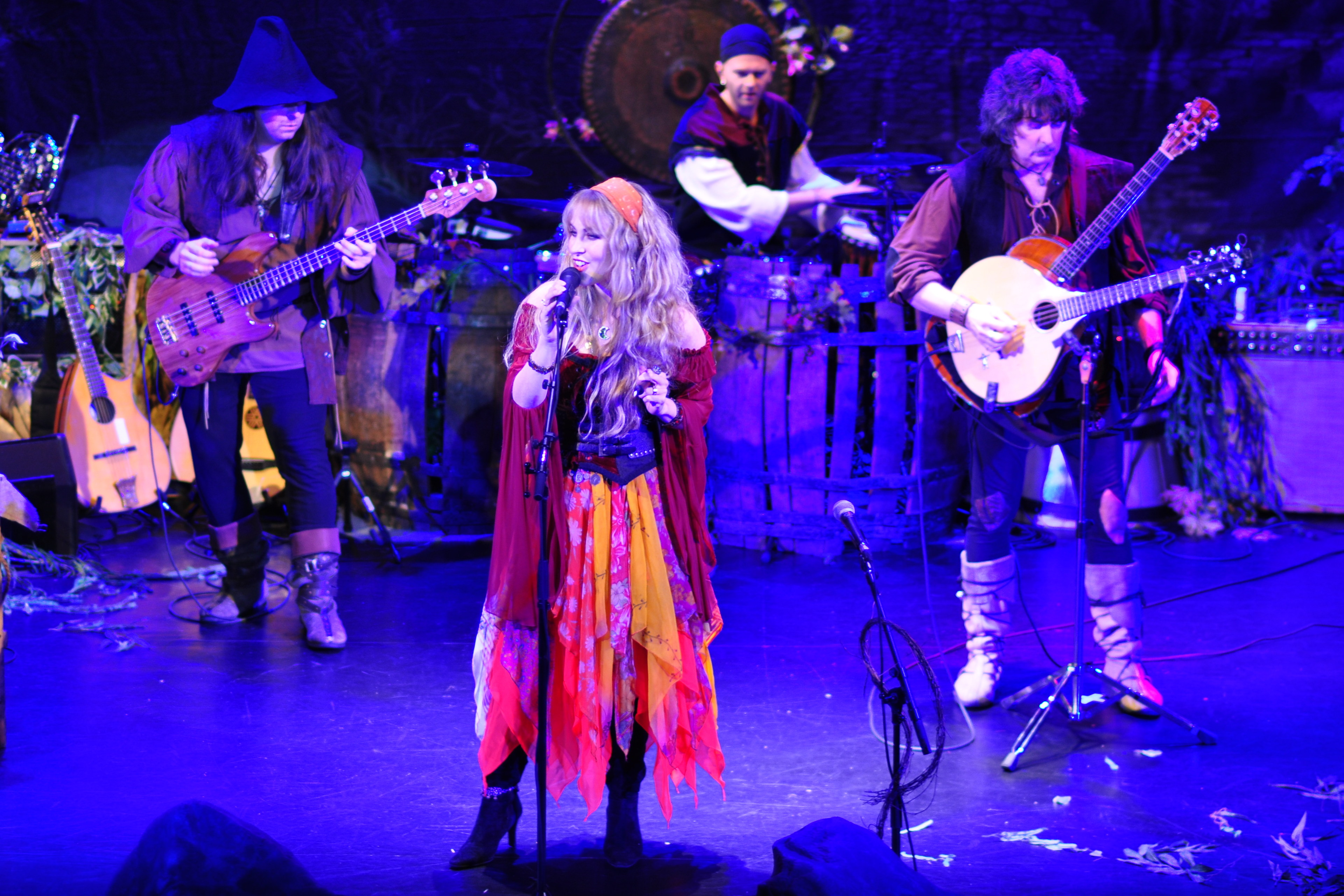
- Blackmore's Night in 2012

Background information
- Origin: United Kingdom
- Genres: Folk rock; medieval rock
- Years active: 1997–present
- Labels: Edel; SPV; Ariola; Frontiers
- Members: Ritchie Blackmore; Candice Night
- Website: blackmoresnight.com

Blackmore's Night is a British-American neo-medieval folk rock band formed in 1997, consisting mainly of Candice Night (lead vocals, lyricist, and woodwinds) and Ritchie Blackmore (acoustic guitar, hurdy gurdy, mandola, mandolin, nyckelharpa, and electric guitar). Blackmore and Night have been the only two constant members through multiple incarnations.

They have released eleven studio albums. Their early releases were mostly acoustic and imitated early music, but eventually Blackmore's Night started using more electric guitars and other modern instruments, as well as performing rearranged cover versions of pop and rock songs in a folk-influenced style.

== History ==
=== Early ===
Candice Night was a Rainbow fan, and first encountered Ritchie Blackmore to ask him for an autograph in 1989, while she was working for a local New York radio station. The two started living together in 1991, and discovered they both had a passionate interest in Renaissance music.

During the reformed Rainbow's recording of the album Stranger in Us All in 1995, on which Night contributed some of the lyrics and backing harmony vocals, the duo were already gearing up their debut album. In 1997, the project started as being a pun of their own names, which would consist of themselves plus session musicians.

=== 1997 to 2005 ===
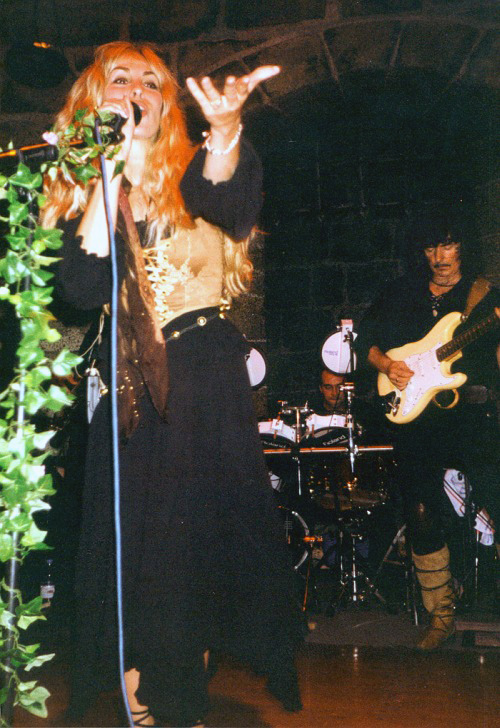
Live in Heidelberg, Germany 2002

Their debut album Shadow of the Moon was a musical success and featured Ian Anderson of Jethro Tull on flute for the song "Play Minstrel Play". In subsequent albums, particularly Fires at Midnight, there was an increased incorporation of rock guitar into the music, while maintaining a folk rock direction. Over time, Night has increasingly participated instrumentally as well as singing the vocals, and is competent on a wide variety of Renaissance instruments.

The group performs at Renaissance fairs and Renaissance festivals, as well as in stand-alone concert tours in appropriate venues including "castle tours" of Europe, where they perform in historic surroundings for an audience dressed largely in period costume. The duo has been successful enough to inspire a number of international tribute bands including: Renaissance Night, the Italian Morning Star, The Midnight and Elflore.

They have also performed the music for MagiQuest, a live simulation game.

=== 2006–present ===
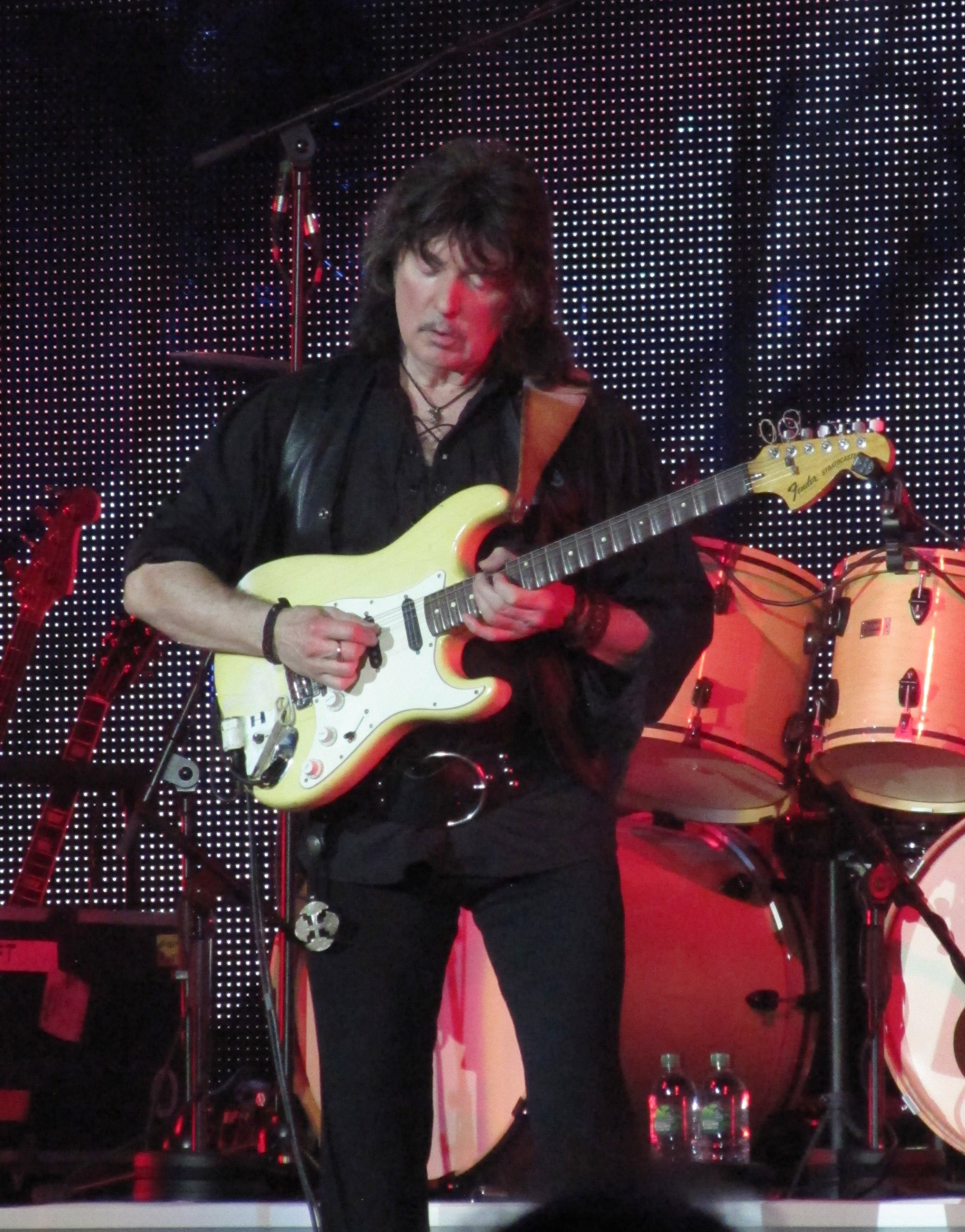
Ritchie Blackmore performing with Rainbow in 2017

In 2006, Night performed a duet with Andi Deris on Helloween's "Light the Universe", which was released as a single in certain countries and is available on their album Keeper of the Seven Keys: The Legacy, released in the same year.

On 27 June 2008, the duo released its seventh studio album called Secret Voyage, a mix of medieval-sounding tracks and some contemporary ones. In addition to some covers of some traditional folk music (“Locked Within the Crystal Ball" is from the fourteenth century) and some originals, Blackmore's Night also performed a cover of a Rainbow song (“Rainbow Eyes”) and an Elvis Presley cover ("Can't Help Falling in Love").

A new album titled Autumn Sky was released at the end of 2010 in Europe and in 2011 in the U.S. This was followed by Dancer and the Moon, in 2013, an album featuring covers of songs by Randy Newman ("I Think It's Going to Rain Today"), Uriah Heep ("Lady in Black") and another Rainbow song (“Temple Of The King”, originally from the album Ritchie Blackmore's Rainbow).

Their album, All Our Yesterdays, was released on 18 September 2015. Their latest studio album, Nature's Light was released worldwide on 12 March 2021.

In 2022, Night was featured on the single "We're Gonna Be Drinking" with the German folkrock band dArtagnan from their album Felsenfest (2022). Blackmore's Night had previously made a version of the song on their 2003 album Ghost of a Rose called "All for One". A live version can be found on the DVD Castles And Dreams.

== Blackmore and Night ==
On 5 October 2008, Night and Blackmore were married after 19 years together. This is the fourth marriage for Blackmore and first for Night. Their daughter Autumn Esmerelda Blackmore was born on 27 May 2010 and their son Rory Dartanyan was born on 7 February 2012.

== Personnel ==
=== Members ===
- Ritchie Blackmore – acoustic and electric guitar, mandolin, mandola, domra, hurdy-gurdy, nyckelharpa
- Candice Night – vocals, chanter, cornamuse, shawm, rauschpfeife, tambourine, woodwinds

=== Additional personnel ===
Current additional personnel

- Jessie Haynes – guitars, recorder, backing vocals (Jul 1997–Oct 1998, May 2022–present)
- Bard David of Larchmont (David Baranowski) – keyboards, backing vocals (May 2003–present)
- Earl Grey of Chimay (Mike Clemente) – bass, mandolin, rhythm guitar (Feb 2008–present)
- Troubadour of Aberdeen (David Keith) – drums, percussion (2012–present)
- Scarlet Fiddler (Claire Smith) – violin (2012–present)

Former additional personnel

- Scott Hazell – harmony & backing vocals (Jan 1997–Mar 2001)
- Mick Cervino – bass (Jul 1997-Aug 2000)
- Joseph James – keyboards (Jul 1997–Dec 1997)
- John O'Reilly – drums, percussion (Jul 1997–Dec 1997)
- Sue Goehringer – backing vocals (1998–Mar 2001)
- Rachel Birkin – violin (Sep 1998–Oct 1998)
- Alex Alexander – drums, percussion (Sep 1998–Jan 2000)
- Adam Forgione – keyboards (Sep 1998–Jan 2000)
- Jim Hurley – violin (Jun 1999-May 2000)
- Marci Geller – keyboards, backing vocals (Jun 1999–May 2001)
- Carmine Giglio – keyboards, backing vocals (Apr 2000–Aug 2002)
- Mike Sorrentino – drums, percussion (Apr 2000–Aug 2001)
- Chris Devine – violin, flute, guitar (Jul 2000–May 2002)
- Sir Robert of Normandie (Robert Curiano) – bass, guitars, backing vocals (Oct 2000–2007)
- Vita Gasparro (Lady Vita) – guitar, vocals (Jul 2001–Dec 2001)
- Squire Malcolm of Lumley (Malcolm Dick) – drums, percussion (Aug 2001–2011)
- Lady Rraine (Lorraine Ferro) – harmony vocals (Apr 2002–May 2002, Oct 2007)
- Lord Marnen of Wolfhurst (Marnen Laibow-Koser) – violin, flute, recorder (Jul 2002–Dec 2003)
- Lady Nancy (Nancy Posner) – backing vocals (Jul 2002–2007)
- Lady Madeline (Madeline Posner) – backing vocals (Jul 2002–2007)
- Tudor Rose (Tina Chancey) – violin, flute (May 2004–2007)
- Baron St James (Barry Waller) – bass (Apr 2007–Mar 2008)
- Gypsy Rose (Elizabeth Cary) – violin, backing vocals (Oct 2007–2011)
- Lady Kelly De Winter (Kelly Morris) – French horn, harmony vocals (2012–Nov 2013)
- The Minstrel Albert (Albert Dannenmann) – Bagpipes, Renaissance wind instruments, backing vocals
- Lady Lynn (Christina Lynn Skleros) – harmony vocals, shawm, flute, and recorder (2014–2022)

Studio musicians

- Pat Regan – various string instruments, keyboards (1997–2008)
- Kevin Dunne – drums (1998–1999)

== Discography ==
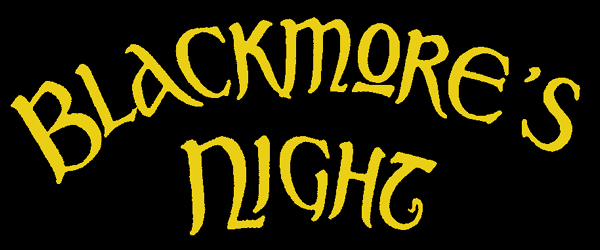
Logo that features on Blackmore's Night's album artwork

- Shadow of the Moon (1997)
- Under a Violet Moon (1999)
- Fires at Midnight (2001)
- Ghost of a Rose (2003)
- The Village Lanterne (2006)
- Winter Carols (2006)
- Secret Voyage (2008)
- Autumn Sky (2010)
- Dancer and the Moon (2013)
- All Our Yesterdays (2015)
- Nature's Light (2021)
