= List of Vicious Rumors members =

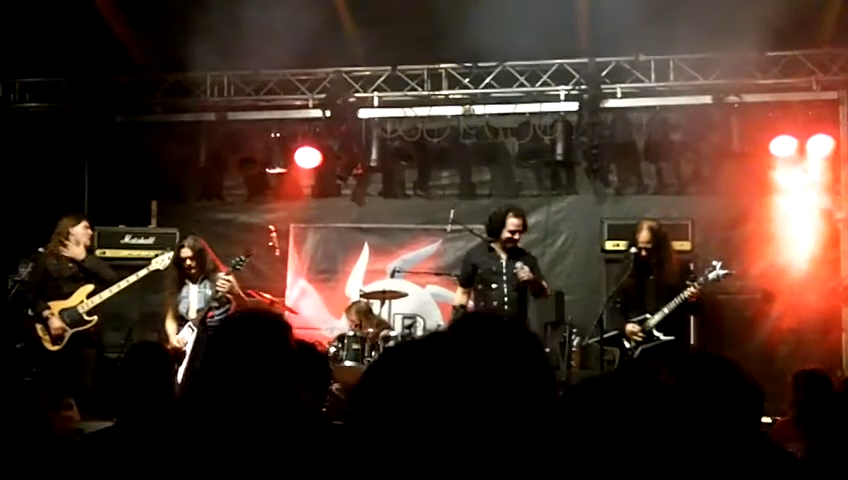
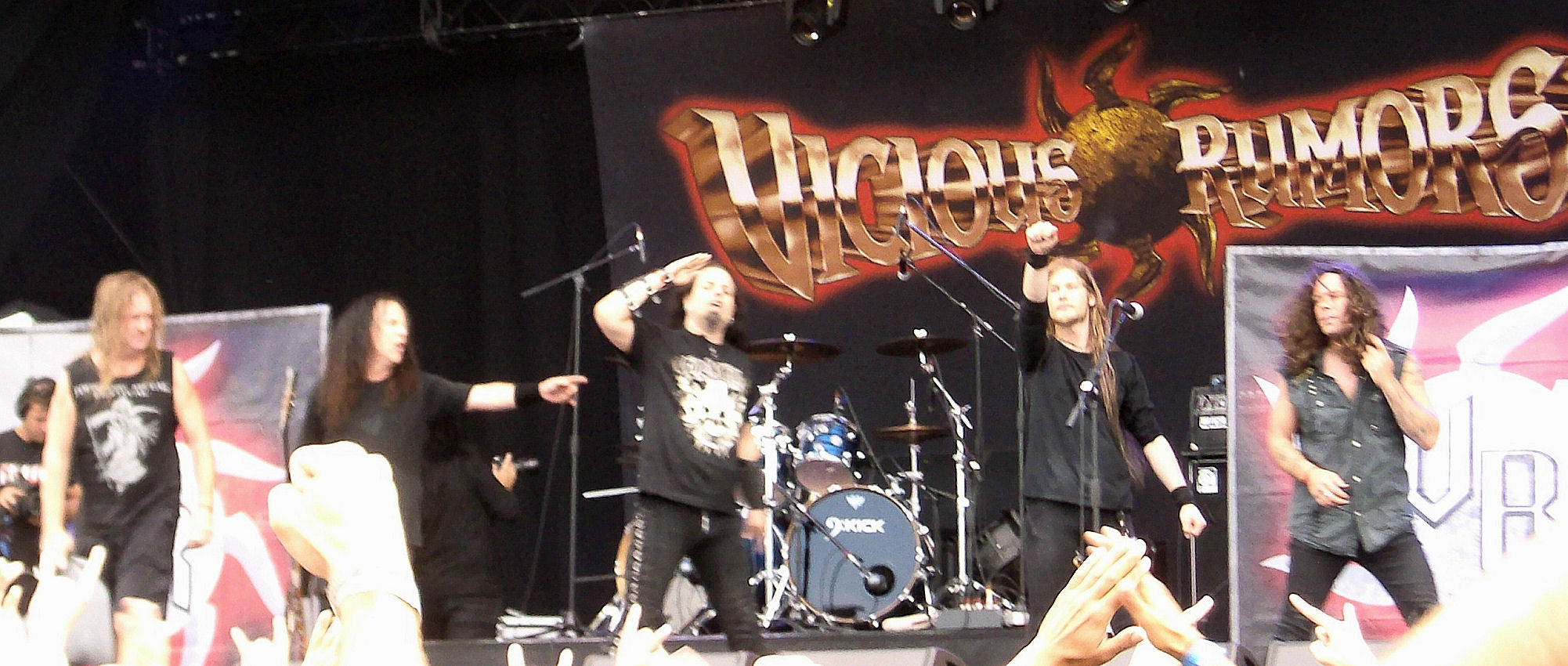
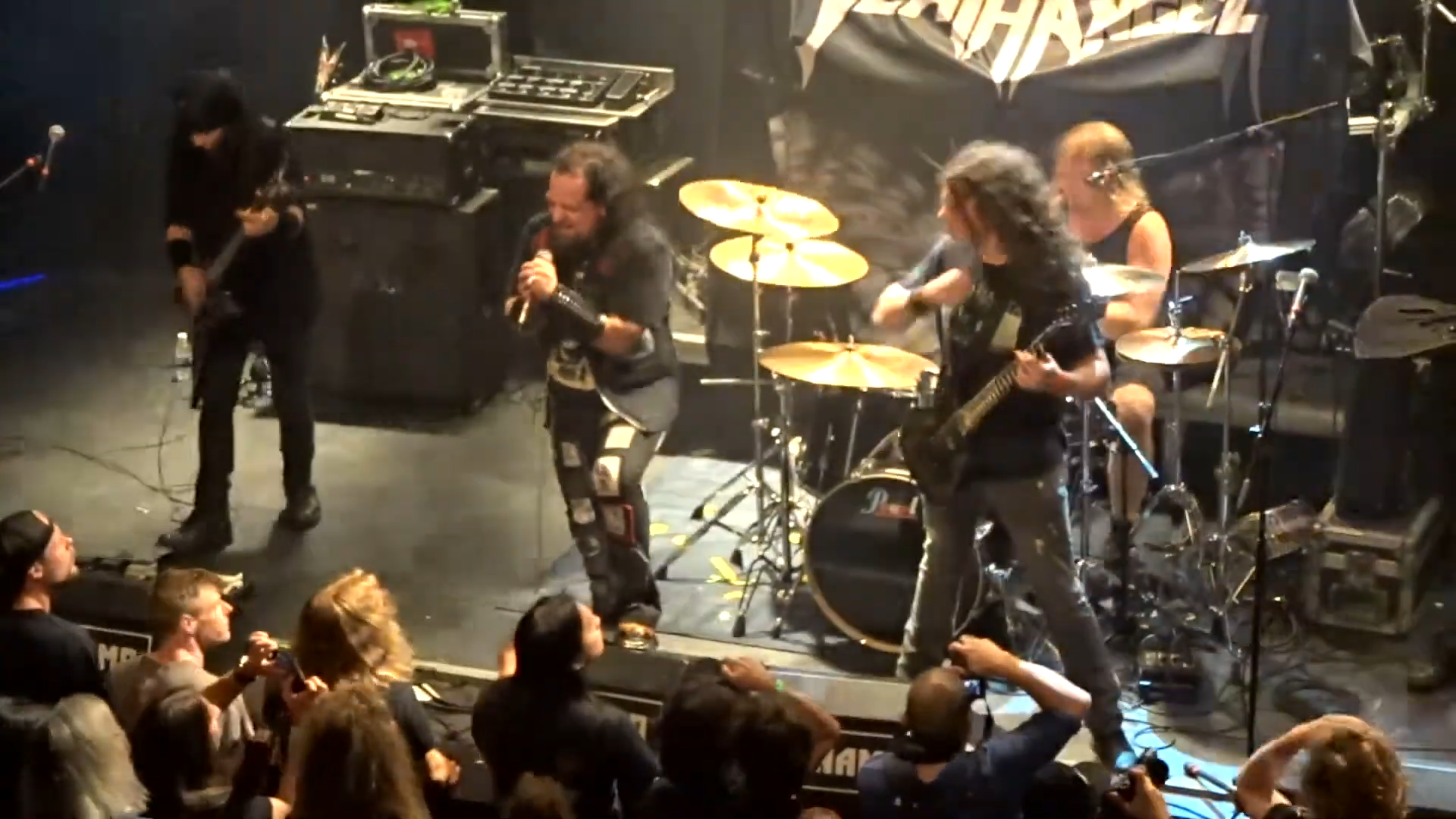
Three line-ups of Vicious Rumors performing in 2011, 2013 and 2017

Vicious Rumors is an American power metal band from Santa Rosa, California. Formed in August 1979, the group originally consisted of guitarists Geoff Thorpe and Jim Cassero, lead vocalist Mark Tate, bassist Jeff Barnacle and drummer Bryan Hurt. By the time the band recorded its first album Soldiers of the Night in 1985, the lineup consisted of Thorpe alongside lead vocalist Gary St. Pierre, guitarist Vinnie Moore, bassist Dave Starr and drummer Larry Howe.

== History ==
=== 1979–1995 ===
Geoff Thorpe formed Vicious Rumors in August 1979 after moving to Santa Rosa to pursue a musical career. The band's original lineup included vocalist Mark Tate, guitarist Jim Cassero and bassist Jeff Barnacle. Bryan Hurt was the group's first drummer, although he left the year after its formation and was replaced by Walt Perkins. During the early 1980s, the band contributed songs to various compilation albums – "I Can Live Forever" on KMEL's New Oasis in 1982, "Ultimate Death" on Shrapnel's US Metal Vol. III with new drummer Jim Lang in 1983, and "One Way Ticket" to US Metal Vol. IV with new vocalist Gary St. Pierre, guitarist Chuck Moomey and drummer Don Selzer in 1984. The group's appearances on the Shrapnel releases led to them signing a two-album deal with the label.

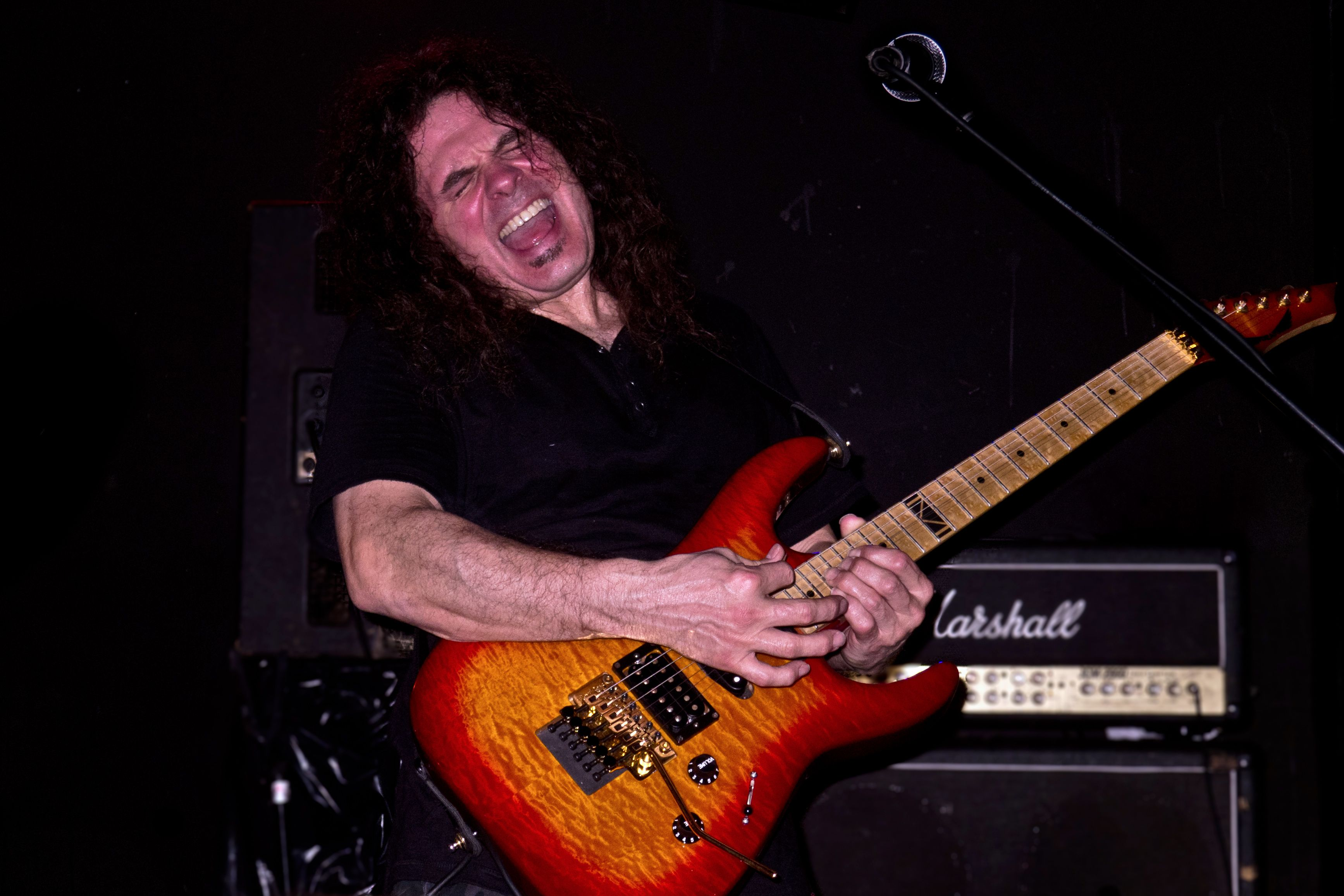
Vinnie Moore was brought in to play guitar on Soldiers of the Night, but left immediately after it was finished.

With a lineup of St. Pierre and Thorpe alongside guitarist Vinnie Moore, bassist Dave Starr and drummer Larry Howe, Vicious Rumors released its full-length debut Soldiers of the Night in 1985. According to Starr, Moore left immediately after the album was recorded, claiming he "was not happy with us, or the band, the music, the whole situation". He was replaced for the subsequent tour by Terry Montana. In November 1986, Carl Albert and Mark McGee replaced St. Pierre and Montana, respectively. Speaking about the personnel changes, Starr has recalled that St. Pierre "wasn't showing up for band practice" and Montana simply "wasn't working out".

With Albert and McGee in place, Vicious Rumors released Digital Dictator in 1988, Vicious Rumors in 1990, Welcome to the Ball in 1991, and their first live album Plug In and Hang On: Live in Tokyo in 1992. In late 1993, Starr left the band. The bassist claims that he initially stepped back from the band to care for his wife that summer, before Thorpe fired him just a few weeks later. Starr was replaced by Tommy Sisco, a former bandmate of Albert's in a group called Villain. Word of Mouth followed in 1994. In early 1995, McGee announced his departure from Vicious Rumors due to musical differences, later joining Gregg Allman's band the Alameda All Stars.

=== 1995–2013 ===
McGee was replaced by Steve Smyth, however just a few weeks after his arrival, frontman Carl Albert died in a car accident. The group went on a brief hiatus and released A Tribute to Carl Albert later that year, featuring live tracks recorded on a European tour in 1994. In 1996, Vicious Rumors returned with Something Burning, on which Thorpe performed lead vocals in lieu of a replacement for Albert. The group toured in promotion of the release as a four-piece before replacing Albert in 1997 with Brian O'Connor. After the release and promotion of 1998's Cyberchrist, Vicious Rumors entered a period of inactivity as "band members began leaving in 1999" according to Smyth, who joined Testament that September.

During 2000, the band recorded Sadistic Symphony with new vocalist Morgan Thorn, guitarist Ira Black, bassist Chris "Cornbread" Lombardo, and session drummer Atma Anur. Shortly after the album's release, O'Connor returned in Thorn's place, while Dan Lawson joined on drums. From 2002, the band toured with Will Carroll in Lawson's place. After releasing a demo called Immortal in 2004, the band announced the return of Larry Howe on drums in January 2005. More lineup changes occurred later in the year – Lombardo left in April, replaced for tour dates that summer by predecessor Tommy Sisco, O'Connor quit in August, and Dave Starr returned as new permanent bassist in September. In November, the group unveiled Helstar frontman James Rivera and Night Ranger guitarist Brad Gillis as new members.

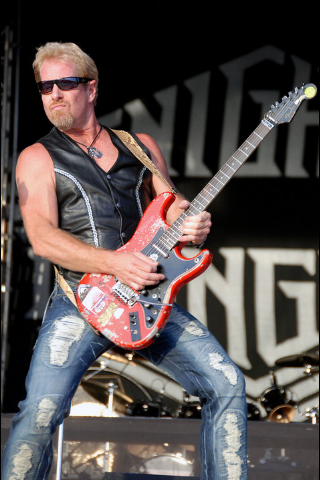
Brad Gillis briefly played with Vicious Rumors, appearing on 2006's Warball.

In March 2006, Gillis was temporarily replaced by Thaen Rasmussen, as he was unable to tour due to family commitments. Gillis did not return, however, and Rasmussen continued touring with the band for the next two years. In January 2007, Starr left for a second time to focus on his side project WildeStarr. He was replaced the next month by Stephen Goodwin. At the end of a tour of Europe in November, both Rivera and Rasmussen left the band, with the vocalist claiming that an altercation with Geoff Thorpe led to their departure. Rivera claimed that Vicious Rumors was "over", but the band responded by saying that it would continue.

Former Shadowkeep vocalist Ronnie Stixx replaced Rivera in February 2008, while Kiyoshi Morgan took over from Thasmussen the month after. Stixx remained until December 2009, when he was replaced by Brian Allen. The new lineup released Razorback Killers in 2011. Before the end of the year, Rasmussen returned and the group recorded Live You to Death. During 2012, the band played with Bob Capka as its second touring guitarist.

=== Since 2013 ===
During May and June 2013, James Rivera temporarily returned in place of regular vocalist Brian Allen, who had to sit out a tour due to "sudden family matters". By July, Allen had been permanently replaced by Nick Holleman, while Stephen Goodwin had also made way for Tilen Hudrap. The new lineup debuted on Live You to Death 2: American Punishment, recorded in the fall. During the band's 2015 tour dates, Capka was replaced again by Thaen Rasmussen. Concussion Protocol was released in August 2016. The following May, the band announced the return of Allen on vocals and the addition of new guitarist Gunnar DüGrey. In July 2018, the group replaced Allen again with Nick Courtney.

A few months after Courtney's arrival, Vicious Rumors began touring with new bassist Cody Green in place of Hudrap, who had joined Pestilence. In 2020, the band released Celebration Decay, on which bass was performed by Greg Christian. Bassist Robin Utbult became a live member before the album's touring cycle and was confirmed after the recording. In 2022 Ronny Munroe joined as new singer, although he was replaced in August 2023 by the returning Brian Allen who started his third tenure. In May 2024, Howe left the band, he was replaced by Gunnar Coston. The following month DüGrey and Allen also departed. Howe returned in July, alongside new guitarist Denver Cooper. New singer, Chalice (real name Brian Betterton), joined the following month. Howe exited the band on April 20, 2025.

== Members ==
=== Current ===
| Image | Name | Years active | Instruments | Release contributions |
|---|---|---|---|---|
| | Geoff Thorpe | 1979–present | guitars; backing vocals; lead vocals (1995-1997, 1999-2000) | all Vicious Rumors releases |
| | Robin Utbult | 2020–present | bass; backing vocals | The Devil's Asylum (2025) |
| | Denver Cooper | 2024–present | guitars | The Devil's Asylum (2025) |
| | Chalice (Brian Betterton) | 2024–present | lead vocals | The Devil's Asylum (2025) |

=== Former ===
| Image | Name | Years active | Instruments | Release contributions |
|---|---|---|---|---|
| | Jeff Barnacle | 1979–1985 | bass | untitled 1982 and 1983 demos |
| | Mark Tate | 1979–1983 | lead vocals | untitled 1982 demo |
| | Jim Cassero | 1979–1983 | guitars | untitled 1982 demo |
| | Bryan Hurt | 1979–1980 (died 2016) | drums | none |
| | Walt Perkins | 1980–1982 | drums | none |
| | Jim Lang | 1982–1983 | drums | untitled 1982 demo |
| | Gary St. Pierre | 1983–1986 (plus one-off live guest in 2009) | lead vocals | untitled 1983 demo |
| | Chuck Moomey | 1983–1985 | guitars | untitled 1983 demo |
| | Don Selzer | 1983–1985 | drums | untitled 1983 demo |
| | Dave Starr | 1985–1993; 2005–2007 | bass; backing vocals | all Vicious Rumors releases from Soldiers of the Night (1985) to Plug In and Hang On: Live in Tokyo (1992); A Tribute to Carl Albert (1995) – three tracks only; Warball (2006) |
| | Vinnie Moore | 1985 | guitars | Soldiers of the Night (1985) |
| | Terry Montana | 1985–1986 | guitars | none |
| | Carl Albert | 1986–1995 (until his death) | lead vocals; harmonica; piano | all Vicious Rumors releases from Digital Dictator (1988) to A Tribute to Carl Albert (1995) |
| | Mark McGee | 1986–1995 (plus guest in 2000, 2011, 2013) | lead guitar; mandolin; bass; backing vocals | all Vicious Rumors releases from Digital Dictator (1988) to A Tribute to Carl Albert (1995) (plus guest appearances on Sadistic Symphony, Razorback Killers and Electric Punishment) |
| | Tommy Sisco | 1993–1999; 2005 (touring) (plus one-off live guest in 2011) | bass; backing vocals | all Vicious Rumors releases from Word of Mouth (1994) to Cyberchrist (1998) |
| | Steve Smyth | 1995–1999 (plus one-off live guest in 2023) | lead guitar; backing vocals | Something Burning (1996); Cyberchrist (1998) (plus guest appearance on Concussion Protocol) |
| | Brian O'Connor | 1997–1999; 2001–2005 | lead vocals | Cyberchrist (1998); Immortal demo (2004) |
| | Ira Black | 2000–2005 (plus one-off live guest in 2023) | guitars | Sadistic Symphony (2001); Immortal demo (2004) |
| | Chris "Cornbread" Lombardo | 2000–2005 (plus one-off live guest in 2023) | bass; backing vocals | Sadistic Symphony (2001); Immortal demo (2004) |
| | Morgan Thorn | 2000–2001 | lead vocals | Sadistic Symphony (2001) |
| | Atma Anur | 2000–2001 | drums | Sadistic Symphony (2001) |
| | Dan Lawson | 2001–2002 | drums | none |
| | Will Carroll | 2002–2005 | drums | Immortal demo (2004) |
| | James Rivera | 2005–2007; 2013 (touring) (plus one-off live guest in 2009) | lead vocals | Warball (2006) |
| | Brad Gillis | 2005–2006 (plus session guest in 2011, 2013 and 2016) | guitars | Warball (2006) (plus guest appearances on Razorback Killers, Electric Punishment and Concussion Protocol) |
| | Thaen Rasmussen | 2006–2007; 2011–2012; 2015–2017 | guitars | Warball (2006); Live You to Death (2012); Electric Punishment (2013); Concussion Protocol (2016) |
| | Kevin Albert (Keven Gorski) | 2006; 2011; 2013; 2019 (special appearances in memory of his father Carl Albert) | lead vocals | none |
| | Stephen Goodwin | 2007–2013 (plus live appearances in 2017 and 2023–2024) | bass; backing vocals | Razorback Killers (2011); Live You to Death (2012); Electric Punishment (2013) |
| | Kiyoshi Morgan | 2007–2012 (plus one-off live guest in 2023) | guitars | Razorback Killers (2011) |
| | Ronnie Stixx | 2007–2009 | lead vocals | none |
| | Brian Allen | 2009–2013; 2017–2018; 2023–2024 | lead vocals | Razorback Killers (2011); Live You to Death (2012); Electric Punishment (2013); 40th Anniversary: Live in Germany (2018) |
| | Bob Capka | 2012–2015 | guitars | Electric Punishment (2013); Live You to Death 2: American Punishment (2014) |
| | Tilen Hudrap | 2013–2018 | bass; backing vocals | Live You to Death 2: American Punishment (2014); Concussion Protocol (2016); 40th Anniversary: Live in Germany (2018) |
| | Nick Holleman | 2013–2017 (plus one-off live guest in 2022) | lead vocals | Live You to Death 2: American Punishment (2014); Concussion Protocol (2016) |
| | Gunnar DüGrey | 2017–2024 | guitars; backing vocals | 40th Anniversary: Live in Germany (2018); Celebration Decay (2020) |
| | Cody Green | 2018–2020 | bass; guitars (studio) | Celebration Decay (2020) |
| | Greg Christian | 2020 (session only) | bass | Celebration Decay (2020) |
| | Nick Courtney | 2020–2022 | lead vocals | Celebration Decay (2020) |
| | Ronny Munroe | 2022–2023 | lead vocals | none |
| | Gunnar Coston | 2024 | drums | none |
| | Larry Howe | 1985–2000; 2005–2024; 2024–2026 | drums; percussion; backing vocals | all Vicious Rumors releases from Soldiers Of The Night (1985) to Cyberchrist (1998) and Warball (2006) to The Devil's Asylum (2025) |

== Lineups ==
| Period | Members | Releases |
|---|---|---|
| 1979–1980 | Geoff Thorpe – guitars, backing vocals; Mark Tate – lead vocals; Jim Cassero – guitars; Jeff Barnacle – bass; Bryan Hurt – drums | none |
| 1980–1982 | Geoff Thorpe – guitars, backing vocals; Jeff Barnacle – bass; Mark Tate – lead vocals; Jim Cassero – guitars; Walt Perkins – drums | "I Can Live Forever" (1982) (released on New Oasis) |
| 1982–1983 | Geoff Thorpe – guitars, backing vocals; Jeff Barnacle – bass; Mark Tate – lead vocals; Jim Cassero – guitars; Jim Lang – drums | untitled 1982 demo; "Ultimate Death" (1983) (released on US Metal Vol. III) |
| 1983–1985 | Geoff Thorpe – guitars, backing vocals; Jeff Barnacle – bass; Gary St. Pierre – lead vocals; Chuck Moomey – guitars; Don Selzer – drums | untitled 1983 demo; "One Way Ticket" (1984) (released on US Metal Vol. IV) |
| Spring – summer 1985 | Geoff Thorpe – guitars, backing vocals; Gary St. Pierre – lead vocals; Larry Howe – drums, backing vocals; Dave Starr – bass, backing vocals; Vinnie Moore – guitars | Soldiers of the Night (1985) |
| Late 1985 – fall 1986 | Geoff Thorpe – guitars, backing vocals; Gary St. Pierre – lead vocals; Larry Howe – drums, backing vocals; Dave Starr – bass, backing vocals; Terry Montana – guitars | none |
| November 1986 – fall 1993 | Geoff Thorpe – guitars, backing vocals; Larry Howe – drums, backing vocals; Dave Starr – bass, backing vocals; Carl Albert – lead vocals, harmonica; Mark McGee – guitars, backing vocals | Digital Dictator (1988); Vicious Rumors (1990); Welcome to the Ball (1991); Plug In and Hang On (1992); A Tribute to Carl Albert (1995) – three previously unreleased tracks |
| December 1993 – early 1995 | Geoff Thorpe – guitars, backing vocals; Larry Howe – drums, backing vocals; Carl Albert – lead vocals, harmonica; Mark McGee – guitars, backing vocals; Tommy Sisco – bass, backing vocals | Word of Mouth (1994); The Voice (1994); A Tribute to Carl Albert (1995) – remaining live tracks |
| Early – April 1995 | Geoff Thorpe – guitars, backing vocals; Larry Howe – drums, backing vocals; Carl Albert – lead vocals, harmonica; Tommy Sisco – bass, backing vocals; Steve Smyth – guitars, backing vocals | none |
| 1995–1997 | Geoff Thorpe – guitars, lead vocals; Larry Howe – drums, backing vocals; Tommy Sisco – bass, backing vocals; Steve Smyth – guitars, backing vocals | Something Burning (1996) |
| 1997–1999 | Geoff Thorpe – guitars, backing vocals; Larry Howe – drums, backing vocals; Tommy Sisco – bass, backing vocals; Steve Smyth – guitars, backing vocals; Brian O'Connor – lead vocals | Cyberchrist (1998) |
| 2000–2001 | Geoff Thorpe – guitars, backing vocals; Ira Black – guitars; Cornbread – bass, backing vocals; Morgan Thorn – lead vocals; Atma Anur – drums (session member) | Sadistic Symphony (2001) |
| Spring 2001 – spring 2002 | Geoff Thorpe – guitars, backing vocals; Ira Black – guitars; Cornbread – bass, backing vocals; Brian O'Connor – lead vocals; Dan Lawson – drums | none |
| Spring 2002 – January 2005 | Geoff Thorpe – guitars, backing vocals; Ira Black – guitars; Cornbread – bass, backing vocals; Brian O'Connor – lead vocals; Will Carroll – drums | Immortal demo (2004) |
| January – April 2005 | Geoff Thorpe – guitars, backing vocals; Ira Black – guitars; Cornbread – bass, backing vocals; Brian O'Connor – lead vocals; Larry Howe – drums, backing vocals | none |
| April – August 2005 | Geoff Thorpe – guitars, backing vocals; Ira Black – guitars; Brian O'Connor – lead vocals; Larry Howe – drums, backing vocals; Tommy Sisco – bass (touring); Mark McGee - guitars, backing vocals (selected gigs only) | none |
| November 2005 – March 2006 | Geoff Thorpe – guitars, backing vocals; Larry Howe – drums, backing vocals; Dave Starr – bass, backing vocals; James Rivera – lead vocals; Brad Gillis – guitars | Warball (2006) |
| March 2006 – January 2007 | Geoff Thorpe – guitars, backing vocals; Larry Howe – drums, backing vocals; Dave Starr – bass, backing vocals; James Rivera – lead vocals; Thaen Rasmussen – guitars | Warball (2006) |
| February – November 2007 | Geoff Thorpe – guitars, backing vocals; Larry Howe – drums, backing vocals; James Rivera – lead vocals; Thaen Rasmussen – guitars; Stephen Goodwin – bass, backing vocals | none |
| March 2008 – December 2009 | Geoff Thorpe – guitars, backing vocals; Larry Howe – drums, backing vocals; Stephen Goodwin – bass, backing vocals; Ronnie Stixx – lead vocals; Kiyoshi Morgan – guitars | none |
| December 2009 – October 2011 | Geoff Thorpe – guitars, backing vocals; Larry Howe – drums, backing vocals; Stephen Goodwin – bass, backing vocals; Kiyoshi Morgan – guitars; Brian Allen – lead vocals | Razorback Killers (2011) |
| October 2011 – summer 2012 | Geoff Thorpe – guitars, backing vocals; Larry Howe – drums, backing vocals; Stephen Goodwin – bass, backing vocals; Brian Allen – lead vocals; Thaen Rasmussen – guitars | Live You to Death (2012); Electric Punishment (2013) |
| Summer 2012 – July 2013 | Geoff Thorpe – guitars, backing vocals; Larry Howe – drums, backing vocals; Stephen Goodwin – bass, backing vocals; Brian Allen – lead vocals; Bob Capka – guitars | none |
| May – June 2013 (temporary touring lineup) | Geoff Thorpe – guitars, backing vocals; Larry Howe – drums, backing vocals; Stephen Goodwin – bass, backing vocals; Bob Capka – guitars (touring); James Rivera – lead vocals (touring); Thaen Rasmussen – guitars (session) | none |
| July 2013 – summer 2015 | Geoff Thorpe – guitars, backing vocals; Larry Howe – drums, backing vocals; Bob Capka – guitars; Tilen Hudrap – bass, backing vocals; Nick Holleman – lead vocals | Live You to Death 2: American Punishment (2014) |
| Summer 2015 – May 2017 | Geoff Thorpe – guitars, backing vocals; Larry Howe – drums, backing vocals; Tilen Hudrap – bass, backing vocals; Nick Holleman – lead vocals; Thaen Rasmussen – guitars | Concussion Protocol (2016) |
| May 2017 – July 2018 | Geoff Thorpe – guitars, backing vocals; Larry Howe – drums, backing vocals; Tilen Hudrap – bass, backing vocals; Gunnar DüGrey – guitars, backing vocals; Brian Allen – lead vocals | 40th Anniversary: Live in Germany (2018) |
| July 2018 – July 2020 | Geoff Thorpe – guitars, backing vocals; Larry Howe – drums, backing vocals; Gunnar DüGrey – guitars, backing vocals; Nick Courtney – lead vocals; Cody Green – bass | none |
| July 2020 – July 2022 | Geoff Thorpe – guitars, backing vocals; Larry Howe – drums, backing vocals; Gunnar DüGrey – guitars, backing vocals; Nick Courtney – lead vocals; Robin Utbult – bass; Greg Christian – bass (studio only) | Celebration Decay (2020) |
| July 2022 – August 2023 | Geoff Thorpe – guitars, backing vocals; Larry Howe – drums, backing vocals; Gunnar DüGrey – guitars, backing vocals; Robin Utbult – bass; Ronny Munroe – lead vocals | none |
| August 2023 - May 2024 | Geoff Thorpe – guitars, backing vocals; Larry Howe – drums, backing vocals; Gunnar DüGrey – guitars, backing vocals; Robin Utbult – bass; Brian Allen – lead vocals; Stephen Goodwin – bass (live only) | none |
| May – July 2024 | Geoff Thorpe – guitars, backing vocals; Gunnar DüGrey – guitars, backing vocals; Robin Utbult – bass; Brian Allen – lead vocals; Gunnar Coston – drums | none |
| August 2024 – present | Geoff Thorpe – guitars, backing vocals; Larry Howe – drums, backing vocals; Robin Utbult – bass, backing vocals; Denver Cooper – guitars; Chalice – lead vocals | The Devil's Asylum (2025) |
