= Savatage discography =

- Studio albums: 11
- Extended plays: 3
- Live albums: 2
- Compilation albums: 5
- Singles: 19
- Video albums: 2
- Music videos: 9

This discography relates to releases by Savatage only. See Trans-Siberian Orchestra, Jon Oliva's Pain, Circle II Circle, Chris Caffery and Doctor Butcher for other related works.

The discography of Savatage, an American heavy metal band, consists of eleven studio albums, two live albums, five compilation albums, two video albums, three EPs, nine music videos, and nineteen singles.

== Albums ==
=== Studio albums ===
List of studio albums, with selected chart positions and certifications
Title	Album details	Peak chart positions								Sales
Title	Album details	US	US Heat	US Indie	AUT	GER	ITA	JPN	SWI	Sales
Sirens	Released: April 11, 1983; Label: Par Records; Formats: CD, CS, LP, DL	—	—	—	—	16	—	—	—	
Power of the Night	Released: May 20, 1985; Label: Atlantic; Formats: CD, CS, LP, DL	—	—	—	—	61	—	—	—	
Fight for the Rock	Released: June 30, 1986; Label: Atlantic; Formats: CD, CS, LP, DL	158	—	—	—	67	—	—	—	
Hall of the Mountain King	Released: September 28, 1987; Label: Atlantic; Formats: CD, CS, LP, DL	116	—	—	—	26	—	—	48	US: 336,000
Gutter Ballet	Released: December 1, 1989; Label: Atlantic; Formats: CD, CS, LP, DL	124	—	—	—	7	—	—	39	
Streets: A Rock Opera	Released: October 15, 1991; Label: Atlantic; Formats: CD, CS, LP, DL	—	31	—	—	9	—	—	—	
Edge of Thorns	Released: April 6, 1993; Label: Atlantic; Formats: CD, CS, LP, DL	—	23	—	—	15	—	52	—	US: 107,880
Handful of Rain	Released: August 16, 1994; Label: Atlantic; Formats: CD, CS, LP, DL	—	31	—	—	20	—	66	—	
Dead Winter Dead	Released: September 22, 1995; Label: Atlantic; Formats: CD, CS, LP, DL	—	18	—	—	80	—	68	98	
The Wake of Magellan	Released: September 15, 1997; Label: Atlantic; Formats: CD, CS, LP, DL	—	26	—	—	11	—	44	99	
Poets and Madmen	Released: March 5, 2001; Label: Nuclear Blast; Formats: CD, CS, LP, DL	—	—	49	70	7	93	—	98	US: 16,517
"—" denotes a recording that did not chart or was not released in that territory.

=== EPs ===
Title	Album details	Peak chart positions
Title	Album details	US
The Dungeons Are Calling	Released: 15 April 1985; Label: Combat; Formats: CD, CS, LP, DL	—
Chance	Released: 1994; Label: Atlantic; Format: CD	—
Doesn't Matter Anyway	Released: 1995; Label: Atlantic; Format: CD	—
"—" denotes a recording that did not chart or was not released in that territory.

=== Live albums ===
Title	Album details	Peak chart positions
Title	Album details	US
Japan Live '94	Released: January 25, 1995; Label: Zero Corporation; Formats: CD, CS, VHS, DVD	—
Ghost in the Ruins – A Tribute to Criss Oliva	Released: December 15, 1995; Label: Zero; Formats: CD, CS	—
Madness Reigns From The Gutter (1990)	Released: June 26, 2026; Label: earMUSIC; Formats: CD, LP, DL	—
"—" denotes a recording that did not chart or was not released in that territory.

=== Compilations ===
Title	Album details	Peak chart positions
Title	Album details	US
From the Gutter to the Stage	Released: 1996; Label: Edel; Format: CD	—
The Best and the Rest	Released: January 10, 1997; Label: JVC Victor; Format: CD	—
Believe	Released: November 18, 1998; Label: Zero; Format: CD	—
Still the Orchestra Plays	Released: March 2, 2010; Label: SPV; Format: CD, DVD	—
Return to Wacken	Released: June 19, 2015; Label: Edel; Format: CD	—
"—" denotes a recording that did not chart or was not released in that territory.

== Videos ==
=== Video albums ===
Title	Album details	Peak chart positions
Title	Album details	US
Japan Live '94	Released: October 9, 1995; Label: Edel; Format: VHS, DVD	—
Streets: A Rock Opera Narrated Version + The Video Collection	Released: 2013; Label: SPV; Format: DVD	—
"—" denotes a recording that did not chart or was not released in that territory.

=== Music videos ===
Year	Song	Director
1987	"Hall of the Mountain King"	
1987	"24 Hours Ago"	
1989	"Gutter Ballet"	
1989	"When the Crowds Are Gone"	
1991	"Jesus Saves"	
1993	"Edge of Thorns"	
1993	"Sleep"	
1994	"Handful of Rain"	
1996	"One Child"	

== Singles ==
List of singles, with selected chart positions, showing year released and album name
Title	Year	Peak chart positions		Album
Title	Year	US Main.	GER	Album
"Hard for Love"	1985	—	—	Power of the Night
"In the Dream"	1985	—	—	Power of the Night
"Out On the Streets"	1986	—	—	Fight for the Rock
"Hall of the Mountain King"	1987	—	—	Hall of the Mountain King
"Strange Wings"	1987	—	—	Hall of the Mountain King
"Gutter Ballet"	1989	—	—	Gutter Ballet
"When the Crowds Are Gone"	1989	—	—	Gutter Ballet
"Jesus Saves"	1991	—	—	Streets: A Rock Opera
"Sammy and Tex"	1991	—	—	Streets: A Rock Opera
"Edge of Thorns"	1993	26	—	Edge of Thorns
"He Carves His Stone"	1993	—	—	Edge of Thorns
"Handful of Rain"	1994	—	—	Handful of Rain
"Chance"	1995	—	—	Handful of Rain
"Doesn't Matter Anyway"	1995	—	—	Dead Winter Dead
"Dead Winter Dead"	1995	—	—	Dead Winter Dead
"One Child"	1996	—	—	Dead Winter Dead
"Turns to Me"	1998	—	—	The Wake of Magellan
"Drive"	2001	—	—	Poets and Madmen
"Commissar"	2001	—	88	Poets and Madmen
"—" denotes a recording that did not chart or was not released in that territory.
