= Carl Albert (musician) =

American singer (1962–1995)

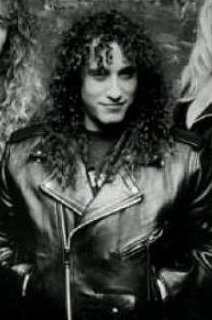
- Albert in 1988

Background information
- Born: May 13, 1962; Santa Monica, California
- Died: April 22, 1995 (aged 32)
- Genres: Heavy metal, power metal
- Occupations: Singer, musician
- Instruments: Vocals, piano, harmonica, guitar
- Years active: 1984–1995
- Formerly of: Vicious Rumors

Carl Spencer Albert (May 13, 1962 – April 22, 1995) was an American singer best known for being the lead vocalist of the heavy metal band Vicious Rumors from late 1986 until 1995. He was a 1979 graduate of Sonora High School in Sonora, California. He played lead guitar in local bands in Tuolumne County for several years, notably in Crossfire, a hard-rock band, Chaser, Uncle Fester (with bandmate Shon Snyder), Ruffians, Villain, and Scratch.

He died on April 22, 1995, as a result of a car crash and is buried in the Saint Patrick's Catholic Mountain View Cemetery in Sonora, California.

In memory of Albert, Vicious Rumors released the CD A Tribute to Carl Albert (including bootleg recordings taken from the last European tour they did together) and the home-video The First Ten Years. The Vicious Rumors song "Perpetual", included on the Something Burning album.

The guitarist Mark McGee, for one of his solo projects (actually unpublished), composed and recorded the song "Find Your Way Home" dedicated to the memory of his lost friend.

Original VR bassist Dave Starr's new band WildeStarr, has a song called "Voice in the Silence" dedicated to Albert on their 2010 debut CD Arrival.

== Discography ==
=== with Vicious Rumors ===
- 1988 – Digital Dictator
- 1990 – Vicious Rumors
- 1991 – Welcome to the Ball
- 1992 – Plug In and Hang On [Live]
- 1994 – Word of Mouth
- 1994 – The Voice [EP]
- 1995 – A Tribute to Carl Albert [Live]

=== with Ruffians ===
- 1984 – Demo [Demo tape]
- 1985 – Ruffians [EP]
- 2004 – 85 & Live [Best of/Compilation]
- 2005 – There & Back [Best of/Compilation]

=== with Villain ===
- 1986 – Only Time Will Tell [EP]

=== with Scratch ===
- 1986 – Beyond the Fear [Demo tape]

== Videography ==
- Vicious Rumors – The First Ten Years (VHS)
