= 9 Sins =

2013 album by Taunted

Studio album by Taunted
- Released: February 25, 2013
- Studios: Fang Studios (San Mateo, California); Trident Studios (Pacheco, California)
- Genres: Thrash metal; power metal; speed metal; melodic death metal
- Length: 49:17
- Label: Mausoleum
- Producer: Joey Genoni

Taunted chronology
Bleeding Black (2009)	9 Sins (2013)	Songs from the Wasteland (2020)

9 Sins is the third full-length studio album by American metal band Taunted. It was released on February 25, 2013, through Mausoleum Records.

The album features a guest appearance by Vicious Rumors drummer Larry Howe.

== Background and recording ==
The album, which was originally scheduled for release in late 2012, was recorded at Fang Studios in San Mateo, California, and Trident Studios in Pacheco, California. It was mixed and mastered at the latter by Juan Urteaga and produced by band member Joey Genoni. It also features a special guest appearance by Vicious Rumors drummer Larry Howe.

== Critical reception ==
9 Sins
Review scores
Source	Rating
Eternal Terror	2.5/6
Heavymetal.dk	3/10
The Metal Crypt	3.5/5
Metallized	55/100
MetalSide	8.5/10
MyGlobalMind	7/10
Rock Hard	6/10

The album received a wide range of reviews from music critics.

In a positive review, Piotr Legieć of MetalSide had high praise for the production, the riffs, the rhythm section, and the vocals (he mused that singer Jacques Serrano was "simply the devil incarnate"), opining that "[i]t all comes together perfectly." He also applauded the consistency in quality of the individual tracks: "There are plenty of such gems throughout the album, and that's precisely where its strength lies."

In a mixed review, MetalMike of The Metal Crypt wrote that "[t]he production is sharp and modern while the music successfully avoids the latter", adding that "there are no gaps in Taunted's impressive wall of sound". However, he also felt that while "there are no weak songs", there was "nothing overly spectacular either". In a similar vein, a reviewer for MyGlobalMind explained: "9 Sins doesn’t really have much in the way of low points [...], but it doesn’t quite have as many highs as I would have liked either." He praised the drumming and, in particular, the vocal performance, concluding that the album is "a solid fix of thrash metal, not much more, and nothing less."

Among its more negative reviews, Matt Coe of Eternal Terror wrote that, aside from Jacques Serrano's vocals and Larry Howe's guest appearance, "not much sticks out in terms of long term, memorable riffs, hooks, or vocal lines that separate the veteran acts in the genres from the second, third, and fourth tier groups". Similarly, Mikaelhe of Heavymetal.dk felt that the album "has its little moments where everything plays perfectly, but they are few and far between and hidden away in the rest of the unruly album." Rino Gissi of Metallized offered that it was "well produced and impeccably played", but that "it struggles to reach a passing grade given its banality" and "the whole thing sounds bland overall".

== Personnel ==
Credits via AllMusic

=== Band members ===
- Jacques Serrano – vocals
- Joey Genoni – guitar, bass engineer, guitar engineer, producer
- Matt Gower – guitar
- Elena Repetto – bass

=== Guest musicians ===
- Larry Howe – drums

=== Additional personnel ===
- Juan Urteaga – drum engineering, mastering, mixing, producer, vocal engineer
- Curt Hurley – bass engineer, guitar engineer
- Matt Grover – bass engineer, guitar engineer
- Didier Scohier – design, layout
- Henry Moreno – artwork, graphics

== Track listing ==
9 Sins track listing
No.	Title	Length
1.	"7 Colors"	4:11
2.	"Laceration"	4:50
3.	"Written In Flames"	5:39
4.	"Dead Doll"	5:05
5.	"Room 237"	3:35
6.	"Sinners Language"	5:06
7.	"Tower Of Hellions"	5:25
8.	"Chaos Theory"	5:03
9.	"Taunted 2"	10:19
Total length:		49:17
