= Japan Live '94 =

1995 live album by Savatage

Live album by Savatage
- Released: January 25, 1995 (Japan); October 9, 1995 (Germany)
- Recorded: November 12, 1994
- Venues: Club Città (Kawasaki, Japan)
- Genres: Heavy metal, progressive metal
- Length: 59:32 (CD)
- Labels: Zero Corporation (Japan); Intercord (Germany)
- Producer: Paul O'Neill

Savatage chronology
Handful of Rain (1994)	Japan Live '94 (1995)	Dead Winter Dead (1995)

Live in Japan cover
- 2000 US edition cover

Professional ratings
Review scores
Source	Rating
Metal Hammer (GER)	6/7
Rock Hard	8.5/10

Japan Live '94

Video by Savatage
- Released: February 22, 1995 (Japan)
- Recorded: November 12, 1994
- Venues: Club Città (Kawasaki, Japan)
- Genres: Heavy metal, progressive metal
- Length: 95 min.
- Labels: Zero Corporation (Japan); SPV (Germany)
- Producer: Paul O'Neill

Savatage video albums chronology
Japan Live '94 (1995)	In The Hall of Anaheim (2010)

Japan Live '94 (also known as Live in Japan) is a live album and VHS by the American heavy metal band Savatage. The show that was recorded was held in Kawasaki, Japan on November 12, 1994, and was the last show on the short Handful of Rain tour. The show is noted for featuring Jon Oliva in a prominent role, his first since "leaving" the band in 1992. Oliva has an extended piano intro on "Gutter Ballet" and shares lead vocals with Zachary Stevens, making it his first performance as a lead vocalist with the band for two years. Oliva also performs rhythm guitar on "Hall of the Mountain King".

The album was released in Japan in January 1995 by Zero Corporation and features a cover with singer Stevens wearing a T-shirt with a red and white circle and cross. In fact, Stevens wore a Corrosion of Conformity T-shirt at the concert, and it was likely "censored" due to label issues. Due to lack of time on the physical support, the entire show was not released onto CD. Missing songs on the CD include "Conversation Piece", "Stare into the Sun", "Damien" and "Hall of the Mountain King". However, these songs were included in the VHS footage of the concert, originally released in 1995 in Japan and in 1998 in North America.

The album was released in the U.S. by Nuclear Blast America in 2000 with a cover featuring both Johnny Lee Middleton and Stevens and the title Live in Japan. In 2000, plans were revealed for the show to be re-issued onto DVD with a possibility of bonus content. A release date of October 2000 was publicised by the band, but possibly due to Nuclear Blast being bought by Century Media, Savatage were unable to release the DVD. Since then, there has not been an announcement of an official DVD release, although copies of the concert have been circulated on DVD. In March 2010, a greatest hit compilation called Still The Orchestra Plays: Greatest Hits Vol. 1 & 2 was released, with the 1994 concert included on a bonus DVD. The quality had not improved much from the VHS-version.

== CD track listing ==
No.	Title	Writer(s)	From the album	Length
1.	"Taunting Cobras"	Jon Oliva	Handful of Rain (1994)	5:01
2.	"Edge of Thorns"	Criss Oliva, J. Oliva, Paul O'Neill	Edge of Thorns (1993)	6:37
3.	"Chance"	J. Oliva, O’Neill	Handful of Rain	4:36
4.	"Nothing’s Going On"	J. Oliva, O’Neill	Handful of Rain	4:31
5.	"He Carves His Stone"	C. Oliva, J. Oliva, O’Neill	Edge of Thorns	3:04
6.	"Jesus Saves"	C. Oliva, J. Oliva, O’Neill	Streets: A Rock Opera (1991)	4:04
7.	"Watching You Fall"	J. Oliva	Handful of Rain	5:24
8.	"Castles Burning"	J. Oliva	Handful of Rain	4:45
9.	"All That I Bleed"	C. Oliva, J. Oliva, O’Neill	Edge of Thorns	5:20
10.	"Handful of Rain"	J. Oliva	Handful of Rain	5:20
11.	"Sirens"	C. Oliva, J. Oliva	Sirens (1983)	3:43
12.	"Gutter Ballet"	C. Oliva, J. Oliva, O’Neill	Gutter Ballet (1989)	7:06

"Live in Japan" 2011 EarMusic CD reissue
No.	Title	Writer(s)	From the album	Length
13.	"Damien"	C. Oliva, J. Oliva, O’Neill	Edge of Thorns	4:06
14.	"Hall of the Mountain King"	C. Oliva, J. Oliva, Johnny Lee Middleton, O'Neill	Hall of the Mountain King (1987)	6:29

== VHS/DVD track listing ==
1. "Taunting Cobras"
2. "Edge of Thorns"
3. "Chance"
4. "Conversation Piece"
5. "Nothing Going On"
6. "He Carves His Stone"
7. "Jesus Saves"
8. "Watching You Fall"
9. "Castles Burning"
10. "All That I Bleed"
11. "Stare into the Sun"
12. "Damien"
13. "Handful of Rain"
14. "Sirens"
15. "Gutter Ballet"
16. "Hall of the Mountain King"

== Personnel ==
Savatage

- Zak Stevens – vocals
- Alex Skolnick – guitars
- Jon Oliva – keyboards, guitars, vocals
- Johnny Lee Middleton – bass
- Jeff Plate – drums

Production

- Paul O'Neill – producer, mixing at Soundtrack Studios, New York
- Zak – engineer
- Toshiyuki Hayashi and the Sci Gang – assistant engineers
- Ken Lewis Moren – mixing engineer
- Ted Moren – mixing assistant
- Brian Weber, Michael Ifversen – audio edit
- Masao Nakazato – mastering at Onkio Haus, Tokyo
