= The First Ten Years (Vicious Rumors video) =

Video by Vicious Rumors
- Released: 1996
- Genres: Power metal, heavy metal
- Length: 69:13
- Label: GTM Management
- Producers: Tommy Sisco, Dave Candelaria

Vicious Rumors chronology
The First Ten Years (1996)	VR – Crushing the World (2005)

The First Ten Years is a VHS compilation album by American heavy metal band Vicious Rumors, released in 1996. It contains various band footage: live, backstage and on-tour in Europe - as well as the band's four MTV videos.

The video has been out of print since the 1990s and is considered to be collectible by fans of the band.

== Track listing ==
1. "Digital Dictator"
2. "Ship of Fools"
3. "Don't Wait for Me"
4. "World Church"
5. "Children"
6. "Against the Grain"
7. "Down to the Temple"
8. "Abandoned" (acoustic version)
9. "The Voice"

== MTV videos ==
1. "Don't Wait for Me"
2. "Children"
3. "Against the Grain"
4. "The Voice"

== Personnel ==
- Carl Albert – vocals
- Gary St. Pierre – vocals
- Geoff Thorpe – guitars
- Mark McGee – guitars
- Vinnie Moore – guitars
- Tommy Sisco – bass
- Dave Starr – bass
- Larry Howe – drums
