= Return to Wacken =

Studio album by Savatage
- Released: 19 June 2015
- Genres: Heavy metal, progressive metal
- Length: 1:02:20
- Label: earMUSIC

Savatage chronology
Still the Orchestra Plays (2010)	Return to Wacken (2015)

Professional ratings
Review scores
Source	Rating
Metal Hammer	4.0/7
Record Collector	2/5

Return to Wacken is a compilation album by American heavy metal band Savatage, released on 19 June 2015. The album contains studio recordings from the band's last two appearances at Wacken Open Air festival in 1998 and 2002.

== Critical reception ==
Critics expressed confusion over the title which sounds like a live album, not a studio compilation. Powermetal.de recommended to get Still the Orchestra Plays instead since it's a more expansive release for the same price. Metal Hammer said the song selection is good but they would have preferred the addition of live tracks, especially since previous collections From the Gutter to the Stage and Still the Orchestra Plays included rare bonus tracks. Record Collector wrote: "Newcomers will find this solid, but even as an introduction it’s far from essential. Probably better to check out the live show instead."

== Track listing ==
No.	Title	Length
1.	"Hall of the Mountain King"	5:33
2.	"Gutter Ballet"	6:20
3.	"Believe"	5:42
4.	"Chance"	7:48
5.	"Edge of Thorns"	5:56
6.	"The Wake of Magellan"	6:10
7.	"Dead Winter Dead"	4:18
8.	"The Hourglass"	8:05
9.	"Tonight He Grins Again"	3:29
10.	"Prelude to Madness"	3:13
11.	"When the Crowds Are Gone"	5:46
