= VR – Crushing the World =

Video by Vicious Rumors
- Released: 2005
- Genre: Power metal, heavy metal
- Length: 82:26
- Label: Mascot Records
- Producer: Geoff Thorpe, Karl Fredrick Anderson II

Vicious Rumors chronology
The First Ten Years (1996)	VR – Crushing the World (2005)

VR – Crushing the World is a DVD compilation by American heavy metal band Vicious Rumors, released in 2005. It contains several live performances, backstage clips, the MTV-era videos produced by Gore Verbinski, and three (at the time) new/unreleased songs.

== Contents ==
1. "Down to the Temple"
2. "On the Edge"
3. "Digital Dictator"
4. "Poveglia"*
5. "March or Die"
6. "Fight"*
7. "You Only Live Twice"
8. "Don't Wait for Me"
9. "Lady Took a Chance"
10. "Broken Wings"*
11. "Abandoned"
12. "Against the Grain"
13. "Children"
14. "Don't Wait for Me"
15. "The Voice"

*Previously unreleased material.

== Personnel ==
- Carl Albert - vocals
- Brian O'Connor - vocals
- Geoff Thorpe - guitars
- Ira Black - guitars
- Mark McGee - guitars
- Vinnie Moore - guitars
- Cornbread - bass
- Tommy Sisco - bass
- Dave Starr - bass
- Will Carroll - drums
- Larry Howe - drums
- Dan Lawson - drums
- Allyson Erick - "Rockumentary" direction, Rockumentary production, Global Recording Artists production
- Karl Fredrick Anderson II - Rockumentary production, Global Recording Artists production
