= Steve Smyth =

American guitarist

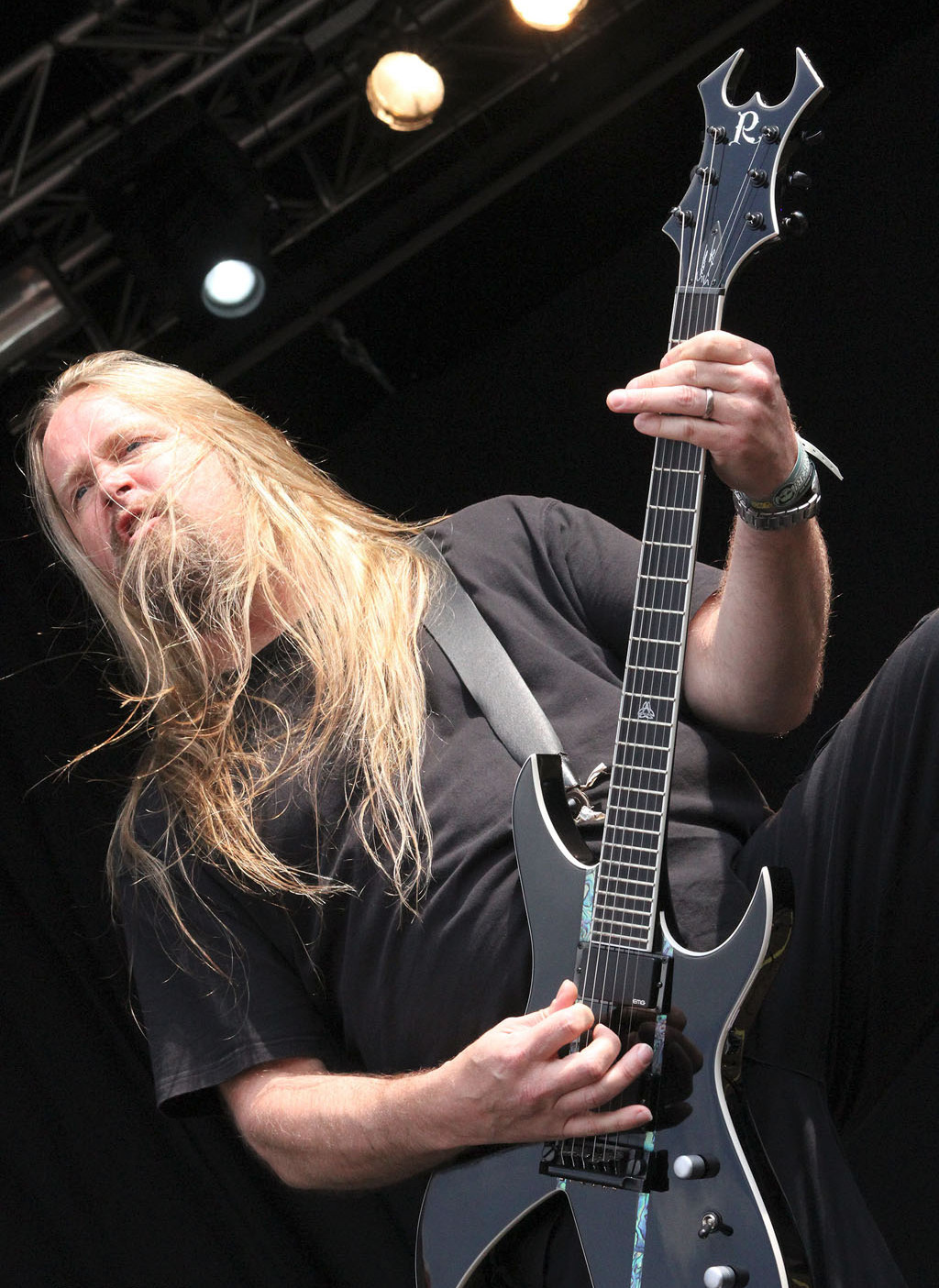

Background information
- Born: November 28, 1970 (age 54)
- Origin: Northern California, U.S.
- Genres: Thrash metal, progressive metal, power metal
- Occupation: Guitarist
- Years active: 1988–present
- Website: stevesmyth.com

Steve Smyth (born November 28, 1970) is an American musician who is currently the guitarist for metal band One Machine. He has previously played guitar with many metal bands including Vicious Rumors, Testament, Nevermore and Forbidden.

== Biography ==
Smyth was born in Northern California and started his career in the female-fronted five-piece melodic death metal band Ariah in 1988. Ariah never released an official studio album, but they recorded a few demos and played local shows. Ariah disbanded in 1992.

After a three-year hiatus, he joined the power metal band Vicious Rumors to replace guitarist Mark McGee who had left the band after the death of Vicious Rumors vocalist Carl Albert. Something Burning (1996) was the first album which Smyth played on. It was followed by Cyberchrist in 1998, and now he participated in songwriting too.

In 1999, Smyth left Vicious Rumors and joined Testament. The Bay Area thrash legend had just released The Gathering album, but lead guitarist James Murphy was diagnosed with a brain tumor, so Testament were in want of a new guitarist for the forthcoming tour. In the next five years, Smyth toured with Testament all around the globe and played uncountable shows as a member of the band, although he never recorded and album with them.

On the other hand, Smyth formed the band Dragonlord as a side project with guitarist Eric Peterson and bassist Steve Di Giorgio of Testament in 2000. This symphonic black metal outfit have released two albums: Rapture (2001) and Black Wings of Destiny (2005).

Seattle-based Nevermore had been friends with Smyth prior to his joining of the band. Initially jokingly, he asked if he could join Nevermore. He joined Nevermore as a touring guitarist, and in 2004, Smyth officially joined the band after helping them tour in Europe. He played guitar in the band along with Jeff Loomis and co-wrote some songs on the critically acclaimed album This Godless Endeavor (2005).

On April 30, 2006, Smyth released a message explaining to fans that he has been diagnosed with kidney failure due to a congenital birth defect. Updates followed on May 30, June 3, and August 9, 2006, on his official website. On December 12, 2006, Smyth had a successful kidney transplantation.

Smyth guest starred as Snazz of Pickles' former band Snakes n' Barrels in two episodes of Metalocalypse.

In the summer of 2007, Smyth left Nevermore due to "personal and business differences". At that time he was working on an all-instrumental album in the vein of progressive rock with his former Ariah bandmate and bassist Steve Hoffman. This side project was named "EssenEss" after their same first names, as a transcription of S'n'S (Steve and Steve). Self-titled The EssenEss Project debut album released on November 5, 2007.

Smyth currently is teaching at the London Institute of Contemporary Music Performance and is now a member of Forbidden.

Steve started an international metal band with classic and modern influences, featuring members carefully selected by Smyth: Mikkel Sandager (Mercenary) on vocals, Jamie Hunt (Biomechanical) sharing guitar duties, rounded out by a powerhouse rhythm section with Tomas "O'Beast" Koefoed (Mnemic) on bass guitar and Michele Sanna on drums (although former drummer Raphael Saini of Italian band Chaoswave played on the album).

Their debut album The Distortion of Lies and the Overdriven Truth was released on February 18, 2014, via Scarlet Records. The CD was recorded and produced by Steve Smyth and was mixed by Roy Z (Judas Priest, Bruce Dickinson, Halford). It was mastered by Alan Douches at West West Side Music, with artwork created by Niklas Sundin from Cabin Fever Media, complemented with photography from Anthony Dubois.

In 2014, Smyth joined the thrash/death metal supergroup From Hell alongside Damien Sisson of Death Angel and Paul Bostaph of Slayer. Their debut album Ascent from Hell was released on April 8, 2014, via Scourge Records.

== Discography ==
=== Albums ===
==== Vicious Rumors ====
- 1996 - Something Burning (Massacre)
- 1998 - Cyberchrist (Massacre)

==== Dragonlord ====
- 2001 - Rapture (Spitfire)
- 2005 - Black Wings of Destiny (Escapi)

==== Nevermore ====
- 2005 - This Godless Endeavor (Century Media)

==== HateSphere ====
- 2005 - "The Sickness Within" (SPV/Steamhammer) (Guest leads on the song "Marked by Darkness")

==== The EssenEss Project ====
- 2007 - The EssenEss Project (Two Louder Music)

==== Intense ====
- 2009 - "Hyperphysics" (Wiolence Worldwide) (Guest leads on the songs "The Wizard", "Burn One" and "Bloodborne")

==== Forbidden ====
- 2010 - Omega Wave (Nuclear Blast)

==== Electric Punishment ====
- 2013 - "Pressure Spike" (Wiolence Worldwide) (Guest leads on the songs "Pressure Spike", "Cold Day In June" and "Coerced")

==== One Machine ====
- 2014 - "The Distortion of Lies and the Overdriven Truth" (Scarlet Records)

==== From Hell ====
- 2014 - "Ascent from Hell" (Scourge Records.)

==== Testament ====
- 1999 - Live in Tokyo, Japan DVD (official bootleg)
- 1999 - Live in Osaka, Japan DVD (official bootleg)
- 2000 - Live Dynamo Open Air 2000, Eindhoven, The Netherlands (official bootleg)
- 2003 - Live Wacken, Germany DVD (official bootleg)
- 2003 - Live in Tilburg, The Nederlands DVD (official bootleg)
