= Rapture (Dragonlord album) =

Studio album by Dragonlord
- Released: October 19, 2001
- Recorded: February & April 2001, Driftwood Studios in Oakland California
- Genre: Symphonic black metal, thrash metal
- Length: 35:08
- Label: Spitfire Records
- Producer: Eric Peterson

Dragonlord chronology
Rapture (2001)	Black Wings of Destiny (2005)

Rapture is the first studio album by the black metal band Dragonlord.

Though essentially a black metal album, much of Eric Peterson's thrash roots can still be heard, likening the sound that to the faster thrash style on Testament's "The Gathering" album mixed with symphonic black metal. This is also the first time Peterson attempted vocals on any recordings.

== Track listing ==
- Lyrics By Eric Peterson & Del James, except where noted. Music By Eric Peterson.
1. "Vals de la Muerte [Instrumental]" – 1:52 (Lyle Livingston)
2. "UnholyVoid" – 4:39
3. "Tradition and Fire" – 5:00
4. "Born to Darkness" – 5:22
5. "Judgement Failed" – 4:20
6. "Wolf Hunt" – 3:25
7. "Spirits in the Mist" – 5:03 (Lyrics: Lawrence Mackrory)
8. "Rapture" – 5:24

== Personnel ==
- Eric Peterson - vocals, rhythm guitar
- Steve Smyth - lead guitar
- Steve Di Giorgio - bass
- Lyle Livingston - keyboards
- Jon Allen - drums

== Production ==
- Arranged By Dragonlord & Del James
- Produced By Dragonlord
- Engineered By Vincent "Vinny" Wojno, with assistance by Kent Mackte.
- Mixed By Daniel Bergstrand at Cutting Room Studios (Uppsala)
