= Still the Orchestra Plays =

Compilation album by Savatage
- Released: March 2, 2010
- Recorded: 1985–2009
- Genres: Heavy metal, progressive metal, power metal
- Length: 129:03
- Label: earMUSIC/Edel
- Producers: Paul O'Neill, Jon Oliva

Savatage chronology
Poets and Madmen (2001)	Still the Orchestra Plays (2010)	Streets: A Rock Opera – Narrated Version (2013)

Professional ratings
Review scores
Source	Rating
AllMusic	4/5 stars
Record Collector	3/5 stars

Still the Orchestra Plays – Greatest Hits, Volume 1 & 2 is a greatest hits compilation album by American heavy metal band Savatage, released in 2010. The title for the compilation was taken from the lyrics in the title track to the band's 1989 release, Gutter Ballet. It was the first release of any kind by the band in almost nine years. The final three tracks on the second disc were brand new acoustic recordings made by Jon Oliva in 2009, featuring him on lead vocals. The set also featured the long-awaited official DVD release of the band's Japan Live '94 video, which until then had only existed on VHS and bootleg DVDs. The album peaked at No. 1 on the Greek Albums Chart in 2010.

== Critical reception ==
Metal.de said "Agony and Ecstasy", "Damien" and "Jesus Saves" were some of the major songs that were missing from the CD portion of the release. The video quality of the DVD was said to be outdated but the sound quality was noted as good. Powermetal.de said the acoustic versions should have been replaced with classic songs like "Hounds", "Jesus Saves", and "Believe". The included DVD was said to be the biggest incentive of the release. The picture and sound quality were remarked as decent. The Bolton News said the album "acts as both a definitive retrospective and excellent primer for those who are unfamiliar with the band." Record Collector wrote: "Disc One is a solid overview of all that was best about Savatage, but Disc Two will appeal to diehards only, especially with the addition of some new acoustic versions of earlier work. Vampster called it a good package overall although they said there were some weaknesses in the setlist.

== Track listing ==
CD 1: Greatest Hits, Volume 1
No.	Title	Lyrics	Music	Length
1.	"Power of the Night" (from Power of the Night, 1985)	Jon Oliva	Criss Oliva	5:16
2.	"Hall of the Mountain King" (from Hall of the Mountain King, 1987)	J. Oliva, Paul O'Neill	C. Oliva, J. Oliva, Johnny Lee Middleton, O'Neill	5:33
3.	"24 Hours Ago" (from Hall of the Mountain King, 1987)	J. Oliva, O'Neill	C. Oliva, J. Oliva, Middleton, O'Neill	4:56
4.	"Legions" (from Hall of the Mountain King, 1987)	J. Oliva	C. Oliva, J. Oliva	4:52
5.	"Gutter Ballet" (from Gutter Ballet, 1989)	J. Oliva, O'Neill	C. Oliva, J. Oliva, O'Neill	6:20
6.	"Summer's Rain" (from Gutter Ballet, 1989)	J. Oliva, O'Neill	C. Oliva, J. Oliva, O'Neill	4:34
7.	"When the Crowds are Gone" (from Gutter Ballet, 1989)	J. Oliva, O'Neill	C. Oliva, J. Oliva, O'Neill	5:46
8.	"Ghost in the Ruins" (from Streets: A Rock Opera, 1991)	J. Oliva, O'Neill	C. Oliva, J. Oliva, O'Neill	5:34
9.	"If I Go Away" (from Streets: A Rock Opera, 1991)	J. Oliva, O'Neill	C. Oliva, J. Oliva, O'Neill	5:18
10.	"New York City Don't Mean Nothing" (from Streets: A Rock Opera, 1991)	J. Oliva, O'Neill	C. Oliva, J. Oliva, O'Neill	4:03
11.	"Edge of Thorns" (from Edge of Thorns, 1993)	J. Oliva, O'Neill	C. Oliva, J. Oliva, O'Neill	5:56
12.	"All That I Bleed" (from Edge of Thorns, 1993)	J. Oliva, O'Neill	C. Oliva, J. Oliva, O'Neill	4:40

CD 2: Greatest Hits, Volume 2
No.	Title	Lyrics	Music	Length
1.	"Handful of Rain" (from Handful of Rain, 1994)	J. Oliva	J. Oliva	5:03
2.	"Chance" (from Handful of Rain, 1994)	J. Oliva, O'Neill	J. Oliva, O'Neill	7:50
3.	"One Child" (from Dead Winter Dead, 1995)	O'Neill	J. Oliva, O'Neill	5:15
4.	"I Am" (from Dead Winter Dead, 1995)	O'Neill	J. Oliva, O'Neill	4:36
5.	"Anymore" (from The Wake of Magellan, 1998)	O'Neill	J. Oliva, O'Neill	5:19
6.	"Hourglass" (from The Wake of Magellan, 1998)	O'Neill	J. Oliva, O'Neill, Al Pitrelli	8:07
7.	"The Wake of Magellan" (from The Wake of Magellan, 1998)	O'Neill	J. Oliva, O'Neill, Chris Caffery, Middleton	6:11
8.	"Morphine Child" (from Poets and Madmen, 2001)	O'Neill	Caffery, J. Oliva, O'Neill	10:13
9.	"Anymore" (Acoustic version, originally taken from The Wake of Magellan, recorded in 2009)	O'Neill	J. Oliva, O'Neill	4:44
10.	"Not What You See" (Acoustic version, originally taken from Dead Winter Dead, recorded in 2009)	O'Neill	J. Oliva, O'Neill	4:14
11.	"Out on the Streets" (Acoustic version, originally taken from Sirens, recorded in 2009)	C. Oliva, J. Oliva	C. Oliva, J. Oliva	4:55

DVD: Live in Japan 1994
No.	Title	Length
1.	"Taunting Cobras"
2.	"Edge of Thorns"
3.	"Chance" (Short version)
4.	"Conversation Piece"
5.	"Nothing Going On"
6.	"He Carves His Stone"
7.	"Jesus Saves"
8.	"Watching You Fall"
9.	"Castles Burning"
10.	"All That I Bleed"
11.	"Stare Into the Sun"
12.	"Damien"
13.	"Handful of Rain"
14.	"Sirens"
15.	"Gutter Ballet"
16.	"Hall of the Mountain King"
