= A Tribute to Carl Albert =

Live album by Vicious Rumors
- Released: 1995
- Genre: Power metal, heavy metal
- Length: 74:37
- Label: GTM, SPV
- Producer: Vicious Rumors

Vicious Rumors chronology
Word of Mouth (1994)	A Tribute to Carl Albert (1995)	Something Burning (1996)

A Tribute to Carl Albert is a live album by heavy metal band Vicious Rumors, released in 1995. This live album is a compilation of recordings done in 1994 during their European Tour and put together as a tribute to singer Carl Albert.

Tracks 1 through 14 were recorded live, while tracks 15–17 are previously unreleased studio tracks.

== Track listing ==
1. "On the Edge"
2. "Abandoned"
3. "No Fate"
4. "Ministry of Fear"
5. "Digital Dictator"
6. "Against the Grain"
7. "The Voice"
8. "Hell Razor"
9. "Thunder and Rain Pt. 1"
10. "Thunder and Rain Pt. 2"
11. "Worlds and Machines"
12. "Thinking of You"
13. "Down to the Temple"
14. "Don't Wait for Me"
15. "My Machine"
16. "Put the Blame on Me"
17. "Indisintegration"

== Personnel ==
- Carl Albert – vocals
- Geoff Thorpe – guitars
- Mark McGee – guitars
- Tommy Sisco – bass
- Dave Starr – bass (on "My Machine", "Put the Blame on Me" and "Indisintegration")
- Larry Howe – drums

== Rationale ==
The details for the recording rationale is included into the album as follow:

This album is a Two Track digital bootleg recorded with 2 Microphones on our last European Tour in "1994". We never planned on releasing these tapes. This is our last album with Carl. It's as raw as can be. "No Overdubs". We put it together to feel like one Show! VR is Forever!!! With Carl's spirit we will carry on as a band.

== Dedication ==
"This album is dedicated to the Best Singer & Friend in the World"

Carl Albert 1962–1995
