= Black Wings of Destiny =

Studio album by Dragonlord
- Released: October 25, 2005
- Recorded: February–March 2005
- Genre: Symphonic black metal
- Length: 44:33
- Label: Escapi/New Media Studio
- Producer: Eric Peterson, Fredrik Nordstrom

Dragonlord chronology
Rapture (2001)	Black Wings of Destiny (2005)	Dominion (2018)

Professional ratings
Review scores
Source	Rating
Allmusic	link

Black Wings of Destiny is the second studio album by the Black metal band Dragonlord.

Almost all of the previous album's thrash roots vanished, replaced with pure black metal. Peterson also began extending creative control to the rest of the band, instead of writing all the music himself for this album. This is also the first album where the band first appeared in photos wearing corpsepaint.

== Track listing ==
1. "The Becoming Of" – 1:18 (Eric Peterson, Derrick Ramirez)
2. "The Curse of Woe" – 5:39 (Peterson, Del James)
3. "Revelations" – 5:52 (Peterson, James, Ramirez, Lyle Livingston)
4. "Sins of Allegiance" – 6:48 (Peterson, James, Ramirez, Steve Smyth)
5. "Until the End" – 4:04 (Peterson, James, Livingston)
6. "Mark of Damnation" – 5:12 (Peterson, James, Livingston)
7. "Blood Voyeur" – 4:33 (Peterson, James, Livingston)
8. "Fallen" – 4:36 (Peterson, James, Smyth)
9. "Black Funeral" – 2:37 (Mercyful Fate cover) (Michael Denner, King Diamond, Hank Sherman)
10. "Emerald" – 3:49 (Thin Lizzy cover) (Brian Downey, Brian Robertson, Scott Gorham, Phil Lynott)

== Personnel ==
- Eric Peterson - vocals, rhythm guitar
- Steve Smyth - lead guitar
- Derrick Ramirez - bass
- Lyle Livingston - keyboards
- Jon Allen - drums
