= Poets and Madmen =

Studio album by Savatage
- Released: March 5, 2001
- Recorded: 1999–2000
- Studios: Soundtrack Studios and Studio 900 (overdubs), New York City
- Genres: Heavy metal, progressive metal
- Length: 62:36
- Labels: SPV/Steamhammer; Nuclear Blast America (US only)
- Producers: Paul O'Neill, Jon Oliva

Savatage chronology
The Wake of Magellan (1998)	Poets and Madmen (2001)	Still the Orchestra Plays (2010)

Singles from Poets and Madmen
- 1. "Commissar" Released: February 5, 2001

Professional ratings
Review scores
Source	Rating
AllMusic	4/5 stars
Metal Hammer (GER)	7/7
Metal Rules	4.5/5
Rock Hard	8.0/10

Poets and Madmen is the 11th studio album by American heavy metal band Savatage, released in 2001. It was their last album before their 12-year hiatus, which lasted from 2002 to 2014. The album has a loose concept inspired by the career and death of journalist Kevin Carter, but has much less narrative in the lyrics than the previous two rock operas (Dead Winter Dead and The Wake of Magellan) penned by Paul O'Neill. Everything said in the album is fiction, except with regard to what is sung about Carter. The album is also noted as it is the only Savatage album to not feature a title song from the album, although the title was taken from lyrics to the track "Symmetry" from the band's 1994 album, Handful of Rain.

The album was the first since Streets: A Rock Opera in 1991 to feature the band's original vocalist Jon Oliva on lead vocals for all songs after the amicable departure of Zachary Stevens. It is also the first Savatage album to have guitarist Chris Caffery playing the majority of the guitar solos. This is partly due to the departure of Al Pitrelli, who left to join Megadeth prior to the album's release. However, Pitrelli was credited with the outro of "Stay With Me Awhile," the main solo of "Morphine Child" (the band's longest song to date at over 10 minutes), the main solo of "The Rumor," and the first part of the main solo and the outro of "Commissar". The United States bonus track "Shotgun Innocence" was originally a bonus track on the Japanese release of Edge of Thorns in 1993 and features Zachary Stevens on lead vocals, and the late Criss Oliva on guitar.

The album cover was drawn by Edgar Jerins, who was responsible for the covers of Dead Winter Dead and The Wake of Magellan.

== Track listing ==
All lyrics are written by Paul O'Neill; all music is composed by Chris Caffery, Jon Oliva, O'Neill, except where noted.

No.	Title	Length
1.	"Stay with Me Awhile"	5:06
2.	"There in the Silence"	4:57
3.	"Commissar"	5:36
4.	"I Seek Power"	6:03
5.	"Drive"	3:17
6.	"Morphine Child"	10:12
7.	"The Rumor"	5:16
8.	"Man in the Mirror"	5:56
9.	"Surrender" (J. Oliva, O'Neill)	6:40
10.	"Awaken"	3:23
11.	"Back to a Reason" (J. Oliva, O'Neill)	6:10

Original US edition bonus track
No.	Title	Writer(s)	Length
12.	"Shotgun Innocence"	Criss Oliva, J. Oliva, O'Neill	3:31

Limited edition bonus tracks
No.	Title	Writer(s)	Length
12.	"Jesus Saves" (live)	C. Oliva, J. Oliva, O'Neill	4:28
13.	"Handful of Rain" (music video)	J. Oliva, O'Neill	4:33

2011 EarMusic reissue bonus tracks
No.	Title	Writer(s)	Length
12.	"Mentally Yours / Tonight He Grins Again" (acoustic version)	C. Oliva, J. Oliva, O'Neill	4:46
13.	"Sleep" (acoustic version)	C. Oliva, J. Oliva, O'Neill	3:54

== Personnel ==
Savatage

- Jon Oliva – lead vocals, keyboards, rhythm guitar, co-producer
- Chris Caffery – lead guitar, backing vocals
- Johnny Lee Middleton – bass, backing vocals
- Jeff Plate – drums, backing vocals

Additional musicians

- Bob Kinkel – additional keyboards, backing vocals
- Al Pitrelli – additional guitars on tracks "Stay with Me Awhile", "Commissar", "Morphine Child" and "The Rumor"
- John West – backing vocals
- Zachary Stevens – lead vocals on "Shotgun Innocence"
- Criss Oliva – guitars on "Shotgun Innocence"

Production

- Paul O'Neill – producer
- Dave Wittman – engineer, mixing
- Bob Kinkel – additional engineering
- Darren Rapp, Ed Osbeck – assistant engineers
- Kevin Hodge – mastering at the Master Cutting Room, New York
- Jeff Thompson, Chris Rich, Ken Thornhill – studio managers
- Edgar Jerins – cover art
- Deborah Lauren – design

== Charts ==
=== Album ===
Year	Chart	Position
2001	German Albums Chart	7
2001	Billboard Independent Albums (US)	49
2001	Austrian Top 40 Albums	70
2001	Dutch MegaCharts	95
2001	Swiss Albums Top 100	97

=== Singles ===
Year	Single	Chart	Position
2001	"Commissar"	German Singles Chart	88
