= Dragonlord (band) =

American symphonic black metal band

- Origin: Oakland, California, U.S.
- Genres: Symphonic black metal, thrash metal (early)
- Years active: 2001–present
- Labels: Spitfire, Escapi, Spinefarm/Universal
- Spinoff of: Testament
- Members: Eric Peterson; Lyle Livingston; Alex Bent; Leah McHenry
- Past members: Steve Di Giorgio; Steve Smyth; Jon Allen; Derrick Ramirez; Mark Black; Claudeous Creamer; Steve Schmidt
- Website: enterthedragonlord.com

Dragonlord is an American symphonic black metal band formed in 2001 as a side project by Eric Peterson and Steve Di Giorgio of Testament, and Steve Smyth of Nevermore. The band resulted from Peterson's inability to play darker music with Testament. The band combines black metal (screeching vocals, keyboards) with thrash guitar influences. Lyrics deal with dragons, death, war, love, Satanism, and the anti-religious themes common in black metal.

DiGiorgio left the group after its creation and was replaced with former Testament bassist Derrick Ramirez. Smyth left the project in 2005. Former Psypheria member Lyle Livingston plays keyboards for the band, and Jon Allen was their drummer. Allen left the group and was replaced with Alex Bent. Vocalist Leah McHenry joined in 2015.

They have released three albums, Rapture in 2001, Black Wings of Destiny in 2005, and Dominion in 2018.

== Band history ==
In 2009, Eric Peterson released the following statement via Kerrang magazine,

After months of hard work in the studio, the new albums' finally shaping up. I've been working real hard alongside Sean Malone who has recorded a lot of the album with me and we both believe it has strong potential. Unfortunately, because of my hectic schedule, I've not been able to make my finishing touches to the album. And because of my commitments to Testament, I'm not gonna have time to finish it any time soon. Therefore, there's not gonna be any new material hitting the streets this year or early next [year]. But we're hoping to be able to resume work in mid-2010 in preparation for an early 2011 release. - Eric Peterson

In 2010, Peterson issued another statement via Terrorizer magazine,

Our record label has recently expressed doubt over the [upcoming] album's potential. At first we were fucking but then we were all sadly brought to reality. Reception to Black metal is possibly the most limited of all in the entire music world; especially the U.S. where the genre's epically failed to find its feet as established movement. So given the circumstances we need to let fans know that making adjustments to the current recordings would put us back another good few thousand. That'd mean possibly creeping into the Testament budget. As I mentioned before, I am not prepared to make any financial risks with Dragon[Lord] until we become as followed as bands like Slipknot or Dimmu Borgir. So I would say there's around an 83% chance the album won't be developed and on the streets at all, 13% chance of me making adjustments and around a 10% of finishing the band. Anyone who knows me will respect my honesty and I can tell you DragonLord doesn't have a future, we would like to make another album; but the metal scene is difficult to flourish in. Dragon definitely withstands no chance. - Eric Peterson

On March 7, 2012, Dragonlord signed to Spinefarm/Universal Records.

As of October 2013, according to Peterson, Dragonlord was recording Dominion, set for release in early 2017. In April 2015, it was announced Dominion was in the mixing stage.

Dominion was released September 21, 2018, and featured Slovenian bassist Tilen Hudrap (U.D.O, Pestilence, Paradox) as a guest on the track "The Discord of Melkor".

== Members ==
=== Current members ===
- Eric Peterson – guitars, vocals, bass
- Lyle Livingston – keyboards
- Alex Bent – drums
- Leah McHenry – vocals

=== Former members ===
- Steve Di Giorgio – bass (2000–2001)
- Steve Smyth – guitars (2000–2005)
- Derrick Ramirez – bass
- Mark Black – guitars
- Jon Allen – drums
- Claudeous Creamer – guitars
- Steve Schmidt – bass
- Gian Pyres – touring guitarist (2005–2006)

== Discography ==
- Rapture (2001)
- Black Wings of Destiny (2005)
- Dominion (2018)
