= Soldiers of the Night =

Studio album by Vicious Rumors
- Released: 1985
- Recorded: Prairie Sun Recording (Cotati, California)
- Genre: Heavy metal
- Length: 39:01
- Label: Shrapnel
- Producers: Vicious Rumors, Steve Fontano

Vicious Rumors chronology
Soldiers of the Night (1985)	Digital Dictator (1988)

Professional ratings
Review scores
Source	Rating
AllMusic	2.5/5 stars
Collector's Guide to Heavy Metal	5/10
Metal Forces	79/100

Soldiers of the Night is the debut studio album by the American heavy metal band Vicious Rumors, released in 1985 through Shrapnel Records in the US and Roadrunner Records in Europe; a remastered edition was reissued in 2010. It is notably the only Vicious Rumors album to feature vocalist Gary St. Pierre as well as guitarist Vinnie Moore, the latter of whom would release his own debut album, Mind's Eye, in 1986.

== Track listing ==
Western Front (side one)
No.	Title	Writer(s)	Length
1.	"Premonition"	Vinnie Moore	1:06
2.	"Ride (Into the Sun)"	Dave Starr, Rick Richards, Gary St. Pierre	3:46
3.	"Medusa"	Geoff Thorpe, St. Pierre	3:59
4.	"Soldiers of the Night"	Thorpe, St. Pierre	4:24
5.	"Murder"	Thorpe	4:02
6.	"March or Die"	Thorpe, St. Pierre, Mark Tate	4:39

Eastern Front (side two)
No.	Title	Writer(s)	Length
7.	"Blitz the World"	Moore, Thorpe, St. Pierre, Dave Starr	3:39
8.	"Invader"	Moore	2:53
9.	"In Fire"	Thorpe	3:23
10.	"Domestic Bliss"	Tate, Thorpe, Jim Cassero	3:42
11.	"Blistering Winds"	Thorpe, Moore	3:28
Total length:			39:01

== Personnel ==
Vicious Rumors

- Gary St. Pierre – lead vocals
- Geoff Thorpe – guitars, backing vocals
- Vinnie Moore – guitars
- Dave Starr – bass, backing vocals
- Larry Howe – drums, gong, tubular bells

Production

- Steve Fontano – production, engineering
- Lionel Baker II – cover art
- Steve Pollutro – logo design
- Jim Marshall – photography
- Tim Gennert – remastering (reissue)
