= Warball =

Studio album by Vicious Rumors
- Released: October 2, 2006
- Genres: Power metal, heavy metal
- Length: 42:58
- Label: Mascot Records
- Producers: Geoff Thorpe, Juan J. Urteaga

Vicious Rumors chronology
Sadistic Symphony (2001)	Warball (2006)	Razorback Killers (2011)

Warball is the ninth album by heavy metal band Vicious Rumors, released in 2006. On this album, the band returned to the power metal sound, which pleased many fans after almost a decade of musical experimentation with their metal sound.

== Track listing ==
1. "Sonic Rebellion" - 2:55
2. "Mr. Miracle" - 4:52
3. "Dying Every Day" - 4:44
4. "Immortal" - 3:56
5. "Warball" - 6:22
6. "Crossthreaded" - 4:46
7. "Wheels of Madness" - 3:46
8. "Windows of Memory" - 3:03
9. "Ghost Within" - 4:56
10. "Oceans of Rage" - 3:39

== Personnel ==
- James Rivera - vocals
- Geoff Thorpe - guitars
- Brad Gillis - guitars on 1-4 & 9
- Thaen Rasmussen - guitars on 2, 7 & 8
- Dave Starr - bass
- Larry Howe - drums
