= Razorback Killers =

Studio album by Vicious Rumors
- Released: March 28th, 2011
- Genre: Power metal, heavy metal
- Length: 51:28
- Label: SPV GmbH
- Producer: Geoff Thorpe, Juan J. Urteaga

Vicious Rumors chronology
Warball (2006)	Razorback Killers (2011)	Electric Punishment (2013)

Razorback Killers is the tenth album by heavy metal band Vicious Rumors, released in 2011.

== Track listing ==
1. "Murderball" - 4:09
2. "Razorback Blade" - 4:15
3. "Black" - 6:01
4. "Bloodstained Sunday" - 5:52
5. "Pearl of Wisdom" - 6:34
6. "All I Want is You" - 4:28
7. "Axe to Grind" - 3:37
8. "Let the Garden Burn" - 5:08
9. "Right of Devastation" - 4:23
10. "Deal with the Devil" - 7:08

== Personnel ==
- Brian Allen - lead vocals
- Geoff Thorpe - guitars, backing vocals
- Kiyoshi Morgan - guitars
- Stephen Goodwin - bass
- Larry Howe - drums
