= Digital Dictator =

- Cover art by Guy Aitchison

Studio album by Vicious Rumors
- Released: February 9, 1988
- Recorded: 1987 at Prairie Sun Recording Studios in Cotati, California
- Genre: Heavy metal
- Length: 38:57
- Label: Shrapnel
- Producer: Steve Fontano, Geoff Thorpe

Vicious Rumors chronology
Soldiers of the Night (1985)	Digital Dictator (1988)	Vicious Rumors (1990)

Digital Dictator is the second studio album by the American heavy metal band Vicious Rumors, released in 1988 through Shrapnel Records (United States) and Roadrunner Records (Europe); a remastered edition was reissued in 2009. This is the first Vicious Rumors album to feature vocalist Carl Albert, who would stay in the band until his death in 1995.

== Track listing ==
"Western Front" (side one)
No.	Title	Writer(s)	Length
1.	"Replicant" (Instrumental)	Dave Starr, Mark McGee	1:04
2.	"Digital Dictator"	Starr, Geoff Thorpe, McGee, Carl Albert	3:17
3.	"Minute to Kill"	Thorpe, Albert, Larry Howe	3:34
4.	"Towns on Fire"	Thorpe, Howe	4:23
5.	"Lady Took a Chance"	Thorpe	6:11

"Eastern Front" (side two)
No.	Title	Writer(s)	Length
6.	"Worlds and Machines"	Thorpe, McGee, Howe	5:30
7.	"The Crest"	Thorpe	2:56
8.	"R.L.H."	Thorpe, Starr, McGee	4:00
9.	"Condemned"	Thorpe, Albert, McGee	3:53
10.	"Out of the Shadows"	Thorpe, McGee, Albert	4:09
Total length:			38:57

== Personnel ==
Vicious Rumors

- Carl Albert – lead vocals
- Geoff Thorpe – guitars, backing vocals
- Mark McGee – guitars, backing vocals, mandolin
- Dave Starr – bass, backing vocals
- Larry Howe – drums, backing vocals

Additional musicians

- John Lavaysse – backing vocals
- Dino Alden – backing vocals

Production

- Steve Fontano – production, engineering, mixing
- Geoff Thorpe – cover concept, mixing, production
- Mark McGee – mixing
- Dave Starr – mixing
- George Horn – mastering
- Dino Alden – assistant engineering
- Guy Aitchison – cover art
- Steve Pollutro – logo
- Rocky Ball – photography
- Doug Troxell – photography, production management, sleeve design
- Rick Likong – photography
- John Umphrey – photography
- Stephanie Ball – photography
- Tim Gennert – remastering (reissue)
