= Cyberchrist =

Studio album by Vicious Rumors
- Released: August 25, 1998
- Genre: Groove metal; heavy metal
- Length: 47:48
- Label: Massacre Records
- Producer: Geoff Thorpe, Steve Fontano

Vicious Rumors chronology
Something Burning (1996)	Cyberchrist (1998)	Sadistic Symphony (2001)

Cyberchrist is the seventh album by heavy metal band Vicious Rumors. It was released in 1998. The record continues the experimentation with the groove metal sound that they started on previous album, Something Burning. It is the final album to feature bassist Tommy Sisco, drummer Larry Howe and guitarist Steve Smyth. It is also the only album to feature lead singer Brian O'Connor.

== Track listing ==
No.	Title	Length
1.	"Cyberchrist"	4:26
2.	"Buried Alive"	5:05
3.	"Kill the Day"	4:23
4.	"No Apologies"	3:29
5.	"Fear of God"	3:56
6.	"Gigs Eviction"	3:13
7.	"Barcelona"	3:07
8.	"Downpour"	3:07
9.	"Candles Burn"	5:09
10.	"Fiend"	2:51
11.	"Faith"	5:12
12.	"Thorne"	3:50
Total length:		51:58

== Personnel ==
- Brian O'Connor – vocals
- Geoff Thorpe – guitars
- Steve Smyth – guitars
- Tommy Sisco – bass
- Larry Howe – drums
