= Sadistic Symphony =

Studio album by Vicious Rumors
- Released: January 24, 2001
- Genre: Groove metal; heavy metal
- Length: 52:18
- Label: Perris Records
- Producer: Geoff Thorpe

Vicious Rumors chronology
Cyberchrist (1998)	Sadistic Symphony (2001)	Warball (2006)

Professional ratings
Review scores
Source	Rating
AllMusic	link

Sadistic Symphony is the eighth album by American heavy metal band Vicious Rumors, released in 2001. This is the only album to feature Morgan Thorn on vocals and also the only album not to have longtime drummer Larry Howe.

== Track listing ==
1. "Break" – 5:06
2. "Sadistic Symphony" – 5:47
3. "March of the Damned" – 5:17
4. "Blacklight" – 8:06
5. "Puritan Demons" – 4:17
6. "Born Again Hard" – 3:47
7. "Neodymium Man" – 4:35
8. "Elevator to Hell" – 3:55
9. "Cerebral Sea" – 4:53
10. "Ascension" – 1:24
11. "Liquify" – 5:11

== Personnel ==
- Morgan Thorn - lead vocals
- Geoff Thorpe - guitars, backing vocals
- Ira Black - guitars
- Cornbread - bass

=== Additional musicians ===
- Mark McGee - additional guitars (tracks 2, 4, 5, 7, 9)
- Atma Anur - drums (tracks 1–10)
- James Murphy - guitar solo (track 11)
- Bill Ackerman - drums (track 11)
