= Vicious Rumors =

American power metal band

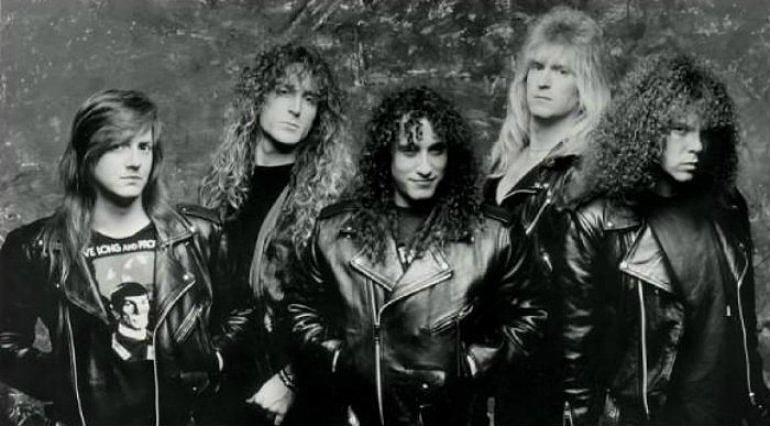
- Vicious Rumors in 1988

Background information
- Origin: San Francisco Bay Area, California, U.S.
- Genres: Power metal; heavy metal; groove metal (1990s)
- Years active: 1979–present
- Labels: Shrapnel; Roadrunner; Atlantic; SPV; Massacre
- Members: Geoff Thorpe; Robin Utbult; Denver Cooper; Chalice
- Past members: See former members

Vicious Rumors are an American power metal band, originally formed in 1979 in the San Francisco Bay Area. The band was conceived by founder and guitarist/vocalist Geoff Thorpe, and has been actively recording and touring worldwide since their full-length recording debut in 1985. They are signed to the Germany-based label SPV/Steamhammer.

== History ==
=== Foundation and full-length debut Soldiers of the Night (1979–1986) ===
Guitarist and composer Thorpe began his musical career as a teenager in Honolulu, Hawaii. He had set out to start forming the band in the San Francisco Bay Area during the summer of 1979. Other Bay Area-based bands like Exodus, Anvil Chorus, Metallica, and Death Angel were also starting out during that era. These bands were playing the same local venues and establishing the Bay Area thrash metal scene—which in a few years would become very popular worldwide.

While working towards a stable lineup, early incarnations of Vicious Rumors played live extensively within California's Bay Area between 1980 and 1985. Their first studio recordings appeared on compilations such as KMEL's New Oasis and U.S. Metal vol. III and IV in 1982, 1983 and 1984. These recordings helped the band obtain their first record deal with the legendary Shrapnel Records.

The band's first full-length album Soldiers of the Night was released in 1985, it featured Geoff Thorpe, Gary St. Pierre, Vinnie Moore, Dave Starr, and Larry Howe. It quickly began to establish VR's worldwide reputation. This release is classed as a milestone and a classic in power metal. The lineup at that time included a young guitarist named Vinnie Moore. (Vinnie originally lived in Delaware, but was recommended to the band by Shrapnel Records founder Mike Varney).

=== The classic Vicious Rumors: from Digital Dictator to Word of Mouth (1987–1994) ===
Late 1986 saw bassist Dave Starr bring in vocalist Carl Albert (Villain, Ruffians) and guitarist Mark McGee (Overdrive, Starcastle, and later with Gregg Allman) to replace St. Pierre and Moore respectively—prior to the recording of the band's second album, Digital Dictator. This release with Shrapnel Records helped define Vicious Rumors' classic US power metal sound. Digital Dictator was the year's No. 1 album in one of Europe's top metal magazines, RockHard. The album sold well in Japan, the US, and the rest of Europe. Vicious Rumors became an international live act at this point: they were invited to appear at the Dutch Aardschok Festival (alongside Megadeth, Testament, and Nuclear Assault), the Dynamo Open Air Festival (where they played in front of 40,000 people), and at live festivals with Death Angel and Forbidden.

An increase in popularity began to generate interest in the band from major record labels, and in 1989 they signed a deal with the legendary major label Atlantic Records (Led Zeppelin, AC/DC,...). Their first Atlantic release was the self-titled Vicious Rumors in 1990. The band subsequently began their first full US tour—which lasted for over three months and shot their first official video, "Don't Wait for Me", directed by Gore Verbinski. This tour was quickly placed in rotation on MTV's Headbangers Ball.

1991 saw the release of Vicious Rumors' fourth album, Welcome to the Ball. This recording received Bay Area Music Awards nominations for "Best New Metal Album" and "Outstanding Metal Album" (other nominees included Metallica and Tesla). Their second MTV video, "Children", went beyond the exposure normally limited to metal bands on Headbangers Ball. It received regular daytime air play. The band finished the year with a one-month European tour—with Savatage—and four months worth of live US performance dates.

After a 1992 tour with label-mates Savatage and the release of the live album Plug In and Hang On: Live in Tokyo, guitarist Thorpe was diagnosed with carpal tunnel syndrome. He was forced to undergo surgery. During the year-long hiatus for Vicious Rumors, the band parted company with both Atlantic Records and bassist Dave Starr.

After Thorpe recovered, new bass player Tommy Sisco (ex-Villain with Carl Albert) was recruited. The band's sixth album, 1994's Word of Mouth, was recorded and released on the Rising Sun label. The CD included the song "Thunder and Rain" (parts 1 and 2), which was dedicated to the memory of Criss Oliva of Savatage.

Sales of "Word of Mouth" were strong, the reception was positive, and the band resumed touring to support the release. Vicious Rumors were now becoming increasingly popular in Europe; they were invited back to the Dynamo Open Air Festival in the Netherlands. They also joined forces with Accept for several summer festival dates. The band returned to Europe later that year for more live shows, this time with Metal Church, Zodiac Mindwarp and the Love Reaction, and Paul Di'Anno's Killers.

=== Death of Carl Albert and subsequent releases (1995–2003) ===
After returning from the European Ultimate-Power-Force-Tour with Metal Church and Paul Di'Anno's Killers, singer Carl Albert was killed in a California Bay Area car accident on April 22, 1995. Around the same time, Mark McGee left the band. Steve Smyth (future member of Nevermore, Testament and Forbidden) was recruited as his replacement.

Upon Albert's death, the band released A Tribute to Carl Albert (culled from non-soundboard recordings taken from the Word of Mouth European tour), and their first home video The First Ten Years. Additionally Mark McGee composed and recorded the song "Find Your Way Home" for one of his solo projects (currently unpublished) and dedicated it to the memory of Albert.

The band decided not to replace Albert at that time, and Thorpe assumed the role of vocalist for the band's next album: Something Burning. This album was released in 1996 on the Massacre Records label. The song "Perpetual", included on the album, was the last track written with Albert. The resulting reviews of the new release were favorable, and VR subsequently undertook a European tour with Accept to support it. Cyberchrist, their next studio album, was recorded and released in 1998 with newcomer Brian O'Connor on vocals. The band was invited by Blind Guardian to join them for 30 tour dates on their highly successful "Nightfall in Middle-Earth" European tour. The band then took some time off from touring and recording primarily to recruit new personnel. They recruited a new bass player, Cornbread, who replaced Tommy Sisco, and Ira Black (ex Heathen—later with Lizzy Borden) filled the spot left by departing guitarist Smyth. Session players Atma Anur, Dan Lawson and Will Carroll (later with Death Angel) briefly sat in for drummer Larry Howe—who at the time wanted to take some time off from touring and recording. The new lineup recorded and released Sadistic Symphony with vocalist Morgan Thorn in 2001, but O'Connor re-joined the band for live dates in the US and Europe in support of the new album. These three albums had a more groove-oriented sound.

There were no new releases by Vicious Rumors in 2002 or 2003. During this period, band leader Thorpe was asked by longtime friend Daniel Jones of rock & roll band 7th Order to take part in recording sessions, alongside veteran British guitarist Martin Pugh (of Steamhammer, the first Rod Stewart solo album and Armageddon) and drummer Tim Kelliher (of Randy Hansen's Machine Gun), for their The Lake of Memory album (released on the Big Island Sounds label in 2007). Several tracks prominently featured Thorpe, and the album enjoyed a great deal of worldwide radio airplay.

=== Return to a traditional sound (2004–2012) ===
From 2004, in order to celebrate the 10th anniversary of the band's "Word of Mouth" release, there were some reunions (Thorpe, Howe, Sisco, plus McGee and Ira Black alternating on guitar and O'Connor on vocals). 2005 saw the release of the band's Crushing the World DVD, which featured both current and historical Vicious Rumors lineups, and included several previously unreleased tracks: "Poveglia", "Broken Wings", "Fight", and "Immortal".

The album Warball (co-produced by Juan Urteaga) was recorded and released on the Mascot Records label in early 2006. Members Cornbread and O'Connor left the band prior to its recording, but original members Dave Starr (bass) and Larry Howe (drums) returned. Vocalist James Rivera (Helstar) and guitarists Brad Gillis (Night Ranger, Ozzy Osbourne) and Thaen Rasmussen (Heathen, Anvil Chorus) contributed to the recordings of the new album. Worldwide sales were excellent and reviewers universally saw the Warball album as a genuine "return to form" of a more traditional Vicious Rumors sound after the more experimental releases of the post-Carl Albert incarnations of the band. 2007 Stephen Goodwin stepped in to serve as bassist, and the band played several dates in Europe, including shows with Agent Steel, HammerFall, Girlschool, Nazareth, and Heaven & Hell.

Upon the band's return to the US, Ronnie Stixx (Divine Ruins, Blood Redskies, Shadowkeep) took over as an interim replacement for the a departing Rivera. Rasmussen was replaced by Kiyoshi Morgan as second guitarist. Stixx was eventually replaced by Brian Allen (Last Empire, Wild Dogs).

In 2009, Thorpe and Howe (alongside Allen, Goodwin and Morgan) acknowledged the 30th Anniversary of the inception of Vicious Rumors, by performing songs from their debut album, Soldiers of the Night, with former singer Gary St. Pierre. at the Headbangers Open Air Festival. In 2011, Mark McGee, Tommy Sisco and Kevin Albert (the son of late vocalist Carl Albert) sat in with the band for their performance at the Keep It True Festival, also in Germany.

The band signed to SPV Records, and their tenth album Razorback Killers was released on March 28, 2011. Several guests joined them for the sessions: Mark McGee, Brad Gillis, and Testament guitarist Eric Peterson. The album also marked the recording debuts of Goodwin, Morgan and Allen. The band then departed for an extensive European summer tour, headlining 60 shows and supporting HammerFall on 30 shows. In early 2012, the band took part in the first heavy metal sea cruise, 70000 Tons of Metal.

In late 2012, after a series of summer festival performances in Europe with new entry Bob Capka on second guitar, the band released a live album, recorded on tour with HammerFall in 2011 – engineered by Pontus Norgren (HammerFall guitarist and FOH engineer for King Diamond, Candlemass) – titled Live You to Death in November 2012.

=== Rotating more members and recent events (2013–present) ===
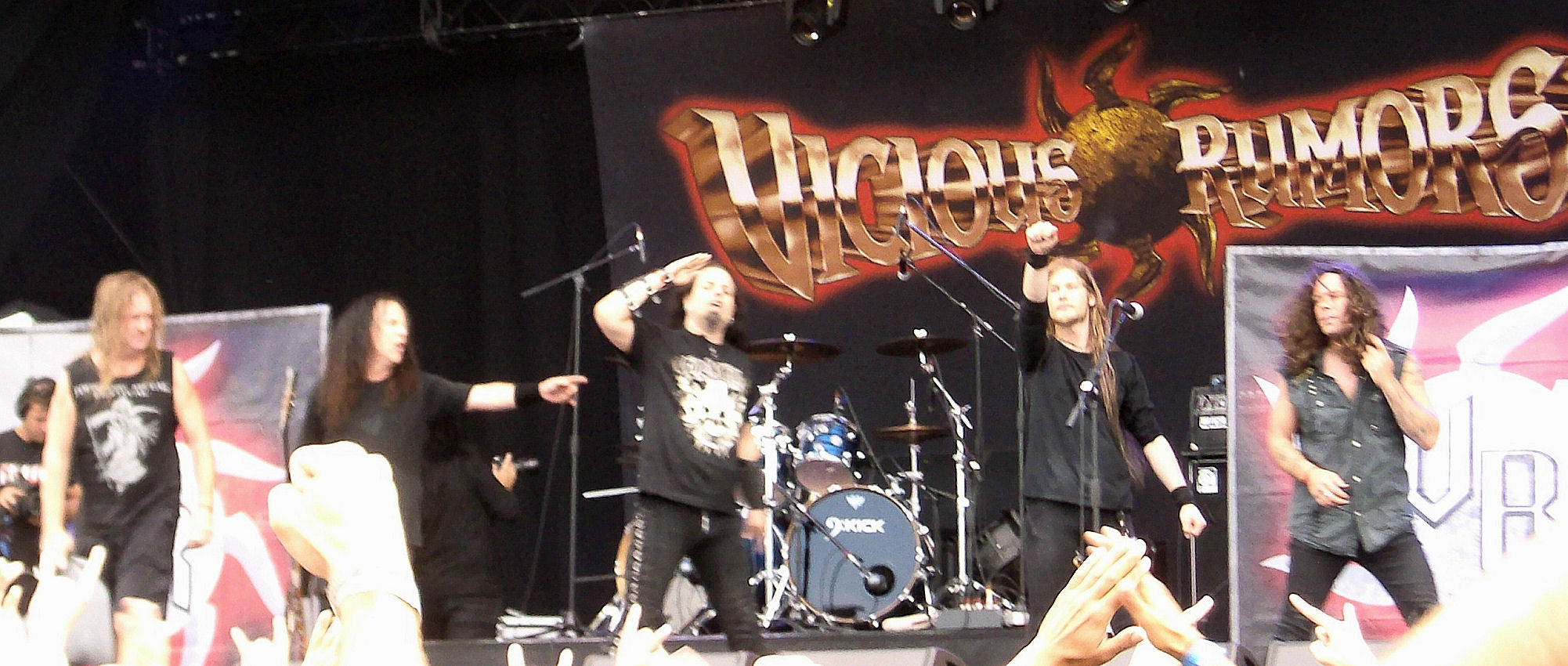
Vicious Rumors performing in 2013

A new studio album, Electric Punishment, was recorded and released on the SPV label in 2013. For their subsequent European tour, James Rivera returned temporarily to replace vocalist Allen. The Slovenian instrumentalist Tilen Hudrap took over for the departing Stephen Goodwin on bass and became the first European member of Vicious Rumors. Thaen Rasmussen and Bob Capka will alternate in those years the second guitar role. The band had played more than 70 shows in 2013, including several metal festivals (Alcatraz festival, Metaldays, Stonehenge festival, Bang Your Head festival, Headbanger's Open Air, Turock Summerfest), and a pre-show performance for the Bang Your Head!!! event in Germany, which again featured a special guest appearance by Kevin Albert. For the band's American tour, Dutch singer Nick Holleman took over as vocalist. The band continued touring into 2014: again playing the 70000 Tons of Metal cruise (playing their Digital Dictator album in its entirety for the first time); as well as several big European summer festivals (headlining in Belgium, Croatia, Holland, Slovenia, Hungary, Germany, Italy, Czech Republic) and numerous live club dates. A live album titled "Live You to Death 2: American Punishment was released in June 2014, the first official release by the new VR lineup with European members Hudrap and Holleman. According to the band's web site, their first live dates in South America took place in December 2014. The band played in São Paulo, Rio de Janeiro, Rio Negrinho, Buenos Aires, and Curitiba. The band embarked in new American and European Tours. In Germany, at Keep It True Festival, Vicious Rumors are once again joined onstage by Keven Albert. Pre-production for the 12th studio album, Concussion Protocol, began in late 2014. It was released August 2016 on SPV/Steamhammer, followed by the singles "Chasing the Priest" and "Take It or Leave It", and a full-scale tour of Europe in November.

In May 2017 the band announced a new line up with the return of vocalist Brian Allen and guitarist Gunnar DüGrey replacing Holleman and Rasmussen respectively. This lineup of Vicious Rumors performed several live dates in Europe, as well as the US (California) in the summer of 2017.

In 2018 and 2019, the band celebrated the 30th anniversary of Digital Dictator with a world tour and a new line up. Nick Courtney was announced as replacement for the again departing Brian Allen on vocals, and Cody Green stepped in on bass for Tilen Hudrap. The touring is intense in US and Europe. In spring 2019, again at Keep It True Festival, Vicious Rumors held a special set with guest Kevin Albert on vocals. In 2020, a new album, Celebration Decay, was released which saw the studio debut of both DuGrey and Courtney. Guests on the record are Greg Christian on bass and Cody Green on guitars, while the band's new live bassist was the Swedish Robin Utbult.

In July 2022, the band announced that former Metal Church vocalist Ronny Munroe had joined the band. On July 24, 2023, Munroe announced his departure for medical reasons. He would be replaced with Brian Allen once again. The band tours once again worldwide, including the long awaited return to Japan. Longest standing member beside Geoff Thorpe, drummer Larry Howe, suddenly announces his departure from the band in May, 2024. For the following gigs is replaced by Gunnar Coston from the band Wicked. One month later also singer Brian Allen and guitarist Gunnar DuGrey step out from Vicious Rumors. Larry Howe anyway returns behind the drumkit very soon, while a new guitarist is found in Denver Cooper. Brian "Chalice" Betterton is announced as new vocalist.

Vicious Rumors' first studio album in five years, The Devil's Asylum, was released on August 29, 2025. On April 20, 2025, Howe exited the band.

== Band members ==
Current

- Geoff Thorpe – guitars, backing and additional lead vocals (1979–present)
- Robin Utbult – bass (2020–present)
- Denver Cooper – guitars (2024–present)
- Brian "Chalice" Betterton – lead vocals (2024–present)

== Discography ==
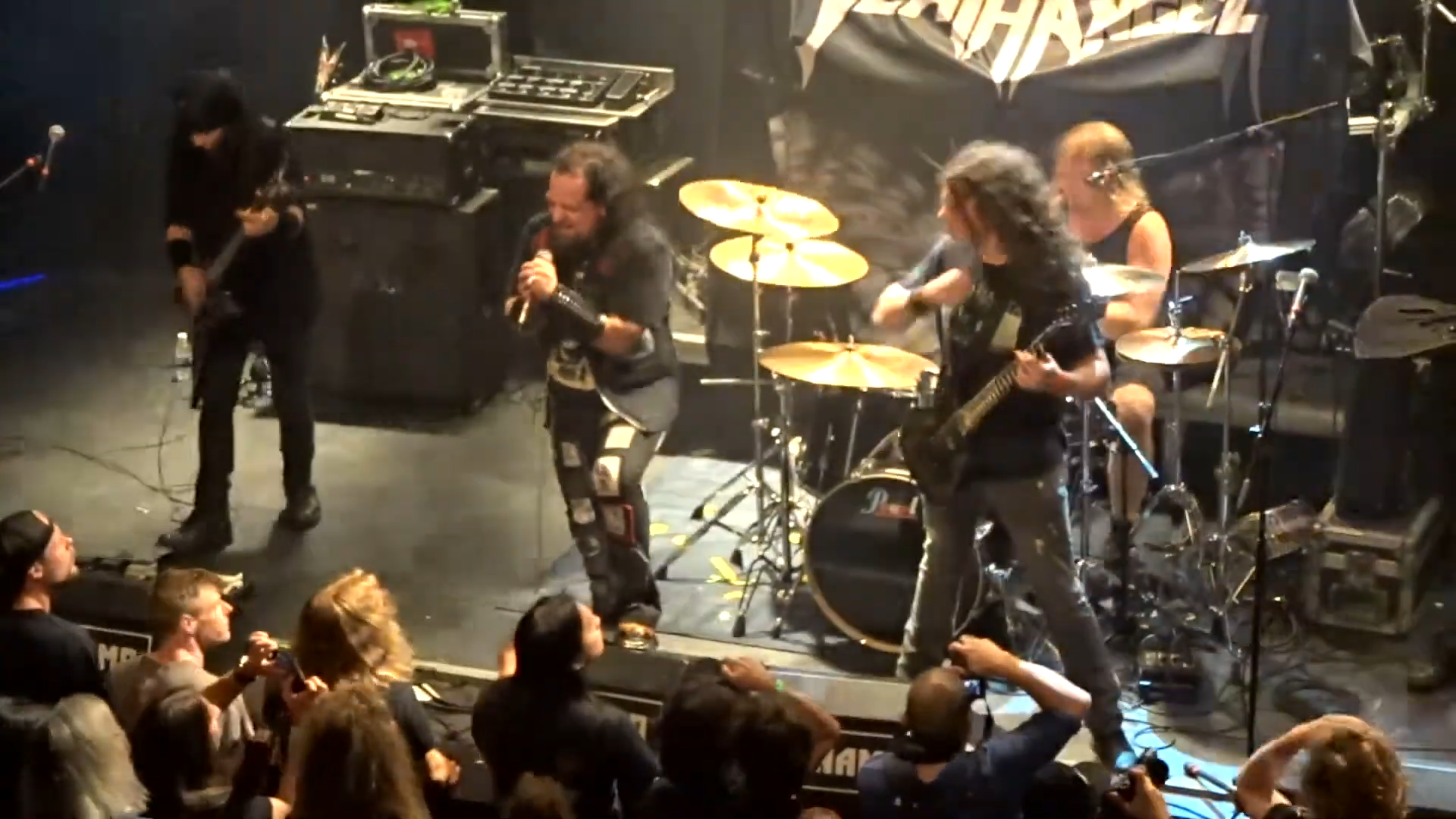
Vicious Rumors performing in 2017

Studio albums

- Soldiers of the Night (1985)
- Digital Dictator (1988)
- Vicious Rumors (1990)
- Welcome to the Ball (1991)
- Word of Mouth (1994)
- Something Burning (1996)
- Cyberchrist (1998)
- Sadistic Symphony (2001)
- Warball (2006)
- Razorback Killers (2011)
- Electric Punishment (2013)
- Concussion Protocol (2016)
- Celebration Decay (2020)
- The Devil's Asylum (2025)

Extended plays

- The Voice (1994)

Live albums

- Plug In and Hang On: Live in Tokyo (1992)
- A Tribute to Carl Albert (1995)
- Live You to Death (2012)
- Live You to Death 2: American Punishment (2014)

Compilation appearances

- "I Can Live Forever" (from the KMEL compilation New Oasis) (1982)
- "Ultimate Death" (from US Metal Vol. III) (1983)
- "One Way Ticket" (from US Metal Vol. IV) (1984)

== Videography ==
- 1996: The First Ten Years (VHS)
- 2005: VR – Crushing the World (DVD)
- 2018: 40th Anniversary – Live in Germany (DVD)
