= Vicious Rumors (Vicious Rumors album) =

Studio album by Vicious Rumors
- Released: February 20, 1990
- Recorded: 1989 at Fantasy, Berkeley, California
- Genre: Power metal, heavy metal
- Length: 39:24
- Label: Atlantic
- Producer: Michael Rosen, Geoff Thorpe, Mark McGee

Vicious Rumors chronology
Digital Dictator (1988)	Vicious Rumors (1990)	Welcome to the Ball (1991)

Professional ratings
Review scores
Source	Rating
AllMusic	3/5 stars

Vicious Rumors is the third album by the American heavy metal band Vicious Rumors, released in 1990.

A music video was made for "Don't Wait for Me", directed by future film director Gore Verbinski.

== Track listing ==
All tracks are written by Vicious Rumors except where indicated.

Side one
No.	Title	Length
1.	"Don't Wait for Me"	4:14
2.	"World Church"	5:05
3.	"On the Edge"	3:07
4.	"Ship of Fools"	4:26
5.	"Can You Hear It"	3:25

Side two
No.	Title	Writer(s)	Length
6.	"Down to the Temple"		5:17
7.	"Hellraiser"		4:14
8.	"Electric Twilight" (Instrumental)	Mark McGee	1:51
9.	"Thrill of the Hunt"		4:01
10.	"Axe and Smash"		3:44
Total length:			39:24

== Personnel ==
- Carl Albert – lead vocals
- Geoff Thorpe – guitars
- Mark McGee – guitars, backing vocals, mandolin
- Dave Starr – bass
- Larry Howe – drums

Production

- Michael Rosen – production, engineering, mixing
- Geoff Thorpe – production, mixing
- Mark McGee – assistant production, mixing
- Howie Weinberg – mastering
- Mike Houghes – back cover logo concept
- Anthony Ranieri – design
- Jay Janini – photography
- Peggy Donnelly – A&R coordination
- Bob Defrin – art direction
- Stan Woch – front cover logo concept
- Don Brautigam – front & back illustration
