= Plug In and Hang On: Live in Tokyo =

Live album by Vicious Rumors
- Released: 1992
- Genre: Power metal, heavy metal
- Length: 47:57
- Label: Atlantic

Vicious Rumors chronology
Welcome to the Ball (1991)	Plug In and Hang On: Live in Tokyo (1992)	Word of Mouth (1994)

Professional ratings
Review scores
Source	Rating
AllMusic	3.5/5 stars

Plug In and Hang On: Live in Tokyo is a live album by American heavy metal band Vicious Rumors, released in 1992.

The material for this CD was recorded in Kawasaki, Japan at Club Citta.

== Track listing ==
1. "Abandoned"
2. "Savior from Anger"
3. "Down to the Temple"
4. "Ship of Fools"
5. "Lady Took a Chance"
6. "When Love Comes Down"
7. "March or Die"
8. "Don't Wait for Me"

== Personnel ==
- Carl Albert - vocals
- Geoff Thorpe - guitars
- Mark McGee - guitars
- Dave Starr - bass
- Larry Howe - drums
