= Welcome to the Ball =

Studio album by Vicious Rumors
- Released: July 19, 1991
- Genres: Heavy metal, power metal
- Length: 45:04
- Label: Atlantic
- Producers: Michael Rosen, Geoff Thorpe

Vicious Rumors chronology
Vicious Rumors (1990)	Welcome to the Ball (1991)	Plug In and Hang On: Live in Tokyo (1992)

Welcome to the Ball is the fourth album by the American heavy metal band Vicious Rumors, released in July 19, 1991. It was produced by Michael Rosen and Geoff Thorpe.

The band supported the album with a North American tour. Welcome to the Ball was nominated for a Bammie Award. A remastered CD version was released by Rock Candy Records in 2024.

== Critical reception ==
Professional ratings
Review scores
Source	Rating
AllMusic	3/5 stars
Chicago Tribune	3/4 stars
Rock Hard	9.0/10
Sputnikmusic	4.0/5

The Chicago Tribune wrote: "By combining the best of two worlds—the anger and energy of thrash with the harmony and intricate guitar work of more commercial metal—Vicious Rumors sets itself apart from the scores of bands doing one or the other." The Washington Post noted that the band "takes its musical marching orders from such aging British headbangers as Judas Priest... Every once in a while, though, the Vicious ones sound like Kansas."

== Track listing ==
All songs written by Carl Albert, Geoff Thorpe and Mark McGee, except where noted.

1. "Abandoned" - 4:15
2. "You Only Live Twice" - 3:38
3. "Savior from Anger" - 4:08
4. "Children" (Thorpe, Albert, Andre Pessis, McGee) - 4:56
5. "Dust to Dust" (McGee, Thorpe) - 4:20
6. "Raise Your Hands" (McGee, Thorpe) - 4:02
7. "Strange Behavior" (Thorpe, McGee) - 4:08
8. "Six Stepsisters" - 3:31
9. "Mastermind" - 3:55
10. "When Love Comes Down" - 4:58
11. "Ends of the Earth" - 3:13

== Personnel ==
- Carl Albert – lead vocals
- Geoff Thorpe – guitars, backing vocals
- Mark McGee – guitars, backing vocals
- Dave Starr – bass
- Larry Howe – drums
