= Something Burning =

Studio album by Vicious Rumors
- Released: September 16, 1996
- Genre: Groove metal; heavy metal
- Length: 40:00
- Label: Massacre Records
- Producer: Geoff Thorpe

Vicious Rumors chronology
A Tribute to Carl Albert (1995)	Something Burning (1996)	Cyberchrist (1998)

Professional ratings
Review scores
Source	Rating
AllMusic	link

Something Burning is the sixth album by heavy metal band Vicious Rumors, released in 1996. It introduces a notable change in the band's musical direction, with the power metal sound being replaced by groove metal; the music is also more aggressive and slower.

This is the first album not to have lead vocalist Carl Albert, who died in 1995 from a car crash and instead, guitarist Geoff Thorpe (who's also the producer for this album) handles the vocals, The song "Perpetual", included on the album, was the last track written with Albert. This is also the first album to feature guitarist Steve Smyth, who replaced Mark McGhee when the latter left shortly after Albert's death.

== Track listing ==
1. "Ballhog" – 3:38
2. "Mouth" – 3:11
3. "Out of My Misery" – 4:00
4. "Something Burning" – 3:41
5. "Concentration" – 4:07
6. "Chopping Block" – 4:10
7. "Perpetual" – 3:54
8. "Strip Search" – 3:35
9. "Make It Real" – 4:45
10. "Free to Go" – 4:59

== Personnel ==
- Geoff Thorpe – guitars, vocals
- Steve Smyth – guitars
- Tommy Sisco – bass
- Larry Howe – drums
