= Criss Oliva =

American guitarist (1963–1993)

- Oliva in 1991

Background information
- Born: Christopher Michael Oliva; April 3, 1963; Pompton Plains, New Jersey, U.S.
- Died: October 17, 1993 (aged 30) Thonotosassa, Florida, U.S.
- Genres: Heavy metal; progressive metal; power metal
- Occupation: Musician
- Instruments: Guitar
- Years active: 1978–1993
- Formerly of: Savatage

Christopher Michael Oliva (April 3, 1963 – October 17, 1993) was an American musician who was the lead guitarist and co-founder of the heavy metal band Savatage. During his lifetime, he released seven studio albums and one EP with the band.

== Biography ==
=== Early life ===
Oliva's family moved around the country during his childhood, stopping off in California before making Florida their home. It was in California that Oliva found music and considered it his calling, and he continued his musical interests when he moved to Florida. His main influences as a guitarist were Ritchie Blackmore, Tony Iommi, Uli Jon Roth and Michael Schenker. He spent countless hours figuring out his favorite songs on records, and when he found it difficult to figure out a part on the record he just made up his own licks. This would later help him in his songwriting.

=== Savatage ===
Oliva and his brother Jon formed their first band together, Avatar, in 1978. Their former bands were Tower and Alien, respectively. In 1980, the duo met up with Steve Wacholz and jammed in a shack behind the Oliva home that was dubbed "The Pit" by the band. They also gave Steve a nickname that would follow him throughout his career: "Doctor Hardware Killdrums", often shortened to just "Doc", which referred to Steve's hard playing style.

"[Criss] had the fluidity of guys like George Lynch and Warren DeMartini, but with an aggressive, melodic conviction that fit Savatage perfectly."

— Alex Skolnick of Testament & Savatage

"You could hear [Criss Oliva's] classical roots and appreciate his knowledge and grasp of modal dexterity that was such a huge signature of his work. He was a trailblazer in metal guitar the way Randy Rhoads was before him."

— Dave Ellefson of Megadeth

"I had a great teacher. Criss Oliva was one of the greatest guitar players of the world and he taught me everything I knew."

— Jon Oliva

"Criss had a feel that was staggering and a sound that was unbelievable. I simply had never heard a better guitar player."

— Paul O'Neill , Savatage producer

With Steve, Criss and Jon played Tampa- (where they had moved with their family in the late-1970s) and Clearwater-area clubs for many years. In 1981, Keith Collins joined them to relieve Jon of bass guitar duties. In 1982, the band released an E.P. on Par Records. In 1983, the day before the release of their debut album, "Avatar" were forced to change their name due to copyright issues. Combining the words "Sabotage" and "Avatar", Oliva (along with his future wife Dawn, his brother Jon and Jon's wife) came up with "Savatage". Savatage released their first two albums, Sirens in 1983, and The Dungeons Are Calling in 1985, both on Par Records, exhibiting a variety of musical styles.

In 1984, Oliva married Dawn Marae Hoppert, his girlfriend since his time in middle school at Philippe Park near Safety Harbor, FL. Meanwhile, Savatage continued to flourish, releasing 6 further albums after signing with Atlantic Records in 1985. This was considered the "Golden Age" of Savatage, particularly when the band collaborated with producer Paul O'Neill for the first time in 1987's Hall of the Mountain King. Oliva's unique playing style won him many fans, including Dave Mustaine of Megadeth, with whom Savatage toured in 1987 in support of Hall of the Mountain King.

Savatage toured relentlessly for their next album Gutter Ballet (1990), with Oliva winning critical acclaim. His biggest dream was for Savatage's 1991 album Streets: A Rock Opera to achieve platinum status. Streets was Savatage's biggest mainstream success, and Oliva enjoyed the exposure the record gave the band, allowing new fans to be found for their music. Savatage was rocked, however, by the sudden departures of Jon Oliva and Steve "Doc" Wacholz in 1992 and 1993 respectively. Criss's best friend Dan Campbell discovered Zachary "Zak" Stevens while in Hollywood California. Dan passed Zak's Wicked Witch demo directly to Oliva, and thus introduced Zak to the band. Zak was then chosen as the replacement for Jon on lead vocals, and Jeff Plate was selected to replace Doc on drums, and Savatage continued, releasing Edge of Thorns in 1993. The front cover of Edge of Thorns is a painting by artist Gary Smith of Oliva's wife, Dawn. The face in the trees is supposed to be Jon Oliva, though producer Paul O'Neill disputes that despite its publication in an interview with Criss from 1993. Gary was also responsible for all of Oliva's airbrushed guitars. On Handful of Rain, Oliva had contributed to writing on two of its songs before his passing, namely "Taunting Cobras" and "Nothing's Going On".

Oliva played Jackson Guitars and Charvel Guitars. His favorite guitar was an ESP that later had a Jackson logo airbrushed on the headstock, with a maple fretboard, reversed headstock, a Bartolini single coil and humbucker pickup, and a transparent blue finish and a gargoyle painted on it, called the "Gargoyle Guitar".

== Death ==
On October 17, 1993, at around 3:30 a.m., Oliva and his wife Dawn were driving north on Highway 301 on their way to the Fourth Annual Livestock Festival held in Zephyrhills, Florida, just north of Tampa. An oncoming car operated by a drunk driver crossed the median and struck Oliva's 1982 Mazda RX-7 head-on. Dawn survived the crash, but Oliva was killed instantly. The drunk driver, who had seven prior drunk driving (DUI) convictions, survived with minor injuries and was later found guilty of DUI manslaughter, DUI serious injury and vehicular homicide, and served 18 months in prison of a five-year sentence.

"Criss could play anything you could imagine. He could work a solo around a vocal without stepping on it, and he was one of the few guitarists who knew how to convey the emotion of the human voice with a guitar. He was a combination of the angst of Duane Allman on "Layla,' the excitement of Jimmy Page, the emotion of Eric Clapton, the raw feel of Joe Perry and the dexterity of Eddie Van Halen or Allan Holdsworth."

— Paul O'Neill, Savatage producer

The thrash metal band Overkill wrote a song named "R.I.P. (Undone)" on their 1994 album W.F.O. as a tribute to Oliva. Vicious Rumors and Testament also dedicated their respective albums, Word of Mouth and Low, to him.

Oliva's grave can be seen at Curlew Hills Memorial Gardens in Palm Harbor, Florida. A special memorial concert took place on November 23, 1993, with the surviving members of Savatage, including elder brother Jon, who returned for one night only, performing a special set. No guitarist played with the band that night, instead opting to leave a white Charvel Predator (Oliva's signature model) with roses going up the neck which resembled the back cover of the Streets album, in the spot where Oliva used to stand. The loss of their lead guitarist nearly signaled the end of Savatage, but during the earlier years the Oliva brothers made an agreement that if one of them were to pass away, the other should continue the band in memory of the other (although some ex-members of the band contest that story). Subsequently, Jon chose to continue the band.

When asked for a comment about Criss, his father said "He lived for that guitar" referring to his love of the guitar. "I would go over to his home for a visit and no matter what he was doing, on the phone, eating dinner, Criss would always have a guitar in his hands."

== Personal life ==
Oliva was the youngest of four children, the next eldest being brother Jon, with whom he formed Savatage.

On January 11, 2005, Oliva's widow Dawn was found dead by her family.

== Discography ==
=== Savatage ===
- Sirens (1983)
- The Dungeons Are Calling (1984)
- Power of the Night (1985)
- Fight for the Rock (1986)
- Hall of the Mountain King (1987)
- Gutter Ballet (1990)
- Streets: A Rock Opera (1991)
- Edge of Thorns (1993)
