= Sirens (Savatage album) =

Studio album by Savatage
- Released: April 11, 1983
- Recorded: January 1983
- Studio: Morrisound (Tampa, Florida)
- Genre: Heavy metal; power metal
- Length: 35:51
- Label: Par Records
- Producer: Dan Johnson

Savatage chronology
City Beneath the Surface (1982)	Sirens (1983)	The Dungeons Are Calling (1984)

UK edition cover

Professional ratings
Review scores
Source	Rating
AllMusic	3/5 stars
Collector's Guide to Heavy Metal	10/10
The Metal Crypt	4/5 stars
Metal Forces	9/10

Sirens is the debut studio album by American heavy metal band Savatage, released on April 11, 1983. The music on this album is heavier than in later Savatage albums, where the band developed their own style of progressive metal. It has also been cited as a key inspiration for the then-burgeoning thrash metal scene.

According to frontman Jon Oliva, Sirens and the EP The Dungeons Are Calling were recorded and mixed all in one day. With most of the songs prepared no more than a week before the recording session, the band could only afford one day in the studio. The two albums together were to make Savatage's debut but since vinyl records limited the total running time, they were divided. In 2011, they were remastered and released together on the label Earmusic.

The cover of the English versions published by both Music for Nations and Combat Records in 1985 used the cover of the children's book The Borribles Go for Broke. It was also used by Metal Blade Records for the first edition on CD and other subsequent versions.

== Track listing ==
Side one
No.	Title	Writer(s)	Length
1.	"Sirens"	Jon Oliva, Criss Oliva	3:43
2.	"Holocaust"	J. Oliva, C. Oliva	4:34
3.	"I Believe"	J. Oliva, C. Oliva	5:25
4.	"Rage"	J. Oliva, C. Oliva	2:42

Side two
No.	Title	Writer(s)	Length
5.	"On the Run"	J. Oliva, C. Oliva, Steve Wacholz	3:33
6.	"Twisted Little Sister"	J. Oliva, C. Oliva, Keith Collins	3:39
7.	"Living for the Night"	J. Oliva, C. Oliva	3:20
8.	"Scream Murder"	J. Oliva	3:50
9.	"Out on the Streets"	J. Oliva, C. Oliva	5:15

Bonus tracks (1994 CD reissue)
No.	Title	Writer(s)	Length
10.	"Lady in Disguise" (demo)	J. Oliva, C. Oliva	4:34
11.	"The Message" (demo)	J. Oliva, C. Oliva	3:38

Bonus tracks (2002 Metal Blade reissue)
No.	Title	Writer(s)	Length
10.	"Target" (demo)	J. Oliva, C. Oliva	4:20
11.	"Living on the Edge of Time" (demo)	J. Oliva, C. Oliva	3:53
99.	"Untitled Acoustic" (hidden track)	C. Oliva	2:17

Bonus track (2011 EarMusic reissue)
No.	Title	Writer(s)	Length
16.	"In the Dream" (acoustic version)	J. Oliva, C. Oliva	3:34

- The track "Out on the Streets" was later re-recorded by the band on their 1986 album, Fight for the Rock and an acoustic rendition was recorded by Jon Oliva and included as bonus track in the 2010 Greatest Hits.
- The track "Lady in Disguise" was also later re-recorded for the 1986 album, Fight for the Rock, but with different arrangements.
- The track "Scream Murder" was covered on American progressive metal band Vanquishes' album Speed Metal Demon.
- The track "Holocaust" was covered by American death metal band Six Feet Under and is featured on their cover album Graveyard Classics.

== Personnel ==
In the liner notes for the album the band gave themselves roles instead of listing their instruments:

- Jon Oliva – Shrieks of Terror (lead vocals, synthesizers, keyboards)
- Criss Oliva – Metalaxe (guitars, backing vocals)
- Keith Collins – The Bottom End (bass, backing vocals)
- Steve Wacholz – Barbaric Cannons (drums, percussion)

== Production ==
- Dan Johnson – producer
- Jim Morris – engineer
- Mike Fuller – mastering
- Jeffrey S. King – US edition artwork
- Terry Oakes – UK edition artwork, illustrations
- Eddy Schreyer – re-mastering

== Charts ==
Chart performance for Sirens
Chart (2021)	Peak position
German Albums (Offizielle Top 100)	16
