= Word of Mouth (Vicious Rumors album) =

Studio album by Vicious Rumors
- Released: 1994
- Genre: Power metal, heavy metal
- Length: 48:03
- Label: GTM, SPV

Vicious Rumors chronology
Plug In and Hang On: Live in Tokyo (1992)	Word of Mouth (1994)	Something Burning (1996)

Word of Mouth is the fifth album by heavy metal band Vicious Rumors, released on the Rising Sun label in 1994, This would be the band's first studio album to feature bassist Tommy Sisco and also the band's final studio album to feature both lead vocalist Carl Albert as the following year, he died from a car accident and guitarist Mark McGee, who departed the same year in 1995.

"Thunder and Rain Pt. 2" is dedicated to the memory of late Criss Oliva, of Savatage.

Professional ratings
Review scores
Source	Rating
AllMusic	link

== Track listing ==
1. "Against the Grain" - 4:21
2. "All Rights Reserved" - 4:42
3. "The Voice" - 4:13
4. "Thinking of You" - 4:56
5. "Thunder and Rain Pt. 1" - 3:15
6. "Thunder and Rain Pt. 2" - 3:06
7. "No Fate" - 4:26
8. "Sense of Security" - 4:30
9. "Dreaming" - 4:14
10. "Building #6" - 4:23
11. "Ministry of Fear" - 4:01
12. "Music Box" - 1:56

=== Bonus tracks in the Japanese Import and European Digi-Pack ===
13. "Communication Breakdown"
14. "Paint It Black"
- Music: 1,3,5,6,7,8,10 by G.Thorpe & M.McGee; 2 by G.Thorpe, M.McGee & L.Howe; 4 by G.Thorpe; 9,11,12 by M.McGee; 13 by John Bonham, John Paul Jones & Jimmy Page; 14 by Keith Richard.
- Lyric: 1,5,7,8,10 by C.Albert & G.Thorpe; 2 by C.Albert, G.Thorpe & M.McGee; 3,9 by G.Thorpe & M.McGee; 4,6,11 by G.Thorpe; 13 by Robert Plant; 14 by Mick Jagger.

== Personnel ==
- Carl Albert - vocals
- Geoff Thorpe - guitars
- Mark McGee - guitars
- Tommy Sisco - bass
- Larry Howe - drums
